

89001–89100 

|-bgcolor=#d6d6d6
| 89001 ||  || — || October 13, 2001 || Socorro || LINEAR || — || align=right | 5.7 km || 
|-id=002 bgcolor=#d6d6d6
| 89002 ||  || — || October 13, 2001 || Socorro || LINEAR || — || align=right | 7.3 km || 
|-id=003 bgcolor=#E9E9E9
| 89003 ||  || — || October 13, 2001 || Socorro || LINEAR || HEN || align=right | 2.7 km || 
|-id=004 bgcolor=#E9E9E9
| 89004 ||  || — || October 13, 2001 || Socorro || LINEAR || — || align=right | 3.0 km || 
|-id=005 bgcolor=#fefefe
| 89005 ||  || — || October 13, 2001 || Socorro || LINEAR || — || align=right | 1.7 km || 
|-id=006 bgcolor=#fefefe
| 89006 ||  || — || October 13, 2001 || Socorro || LINEAR || NYS || align=right | 3.9 km || 
|-id=007 bgcolor=#E9E9E9
| 89007 ||  || — || October 13, 2001 || Socorro || LINEAR || — || align=right | 5.4 km || 
|-id=008 bgcolor=#fefefe
| 89008 ||  || — || October 13, 2001 || Socorro || LINEAR || — || align=right | 1.6 km || 
|-id=009 bgcolor=#E9E9E9
| 89009 ||  || — || October 13, 2001 || Socorro || LINEAR || — || align=right | 4.1 km || 
|-id=010 bgcolor=#fefefe
| 89010 ||  || — || October 13, 2001 || Socorro || LINEAR || — || align=right | 2.6 km || 
|-id=011 bgcolor=#E9E9E9
| 89011 ||  || — || October 14, 2001 || Socorro || LINEAR || — || align=right | 6.0 km || 
|-id=012 bgcolor=#d6d6d6
| 89012 ||  || — || October 14, 2001 || Socorro || LINEAR || HYG || align=right | 4.4 km || 
|-id=013 bgcolor=#fefefe
| 89013 ||  || — || October 14, 2001 || Socorro || LINEAR || — || align=right | 1.5 km || 
|-id=014 bgcolor=#fefefe
| 89014 ||  || — || October 14, 2001 || Socorro || LINEAR || — || align=right | 1.9 km || 
|-id=015 bgcolor=#d6d6d6
| 89015 ||  || — || October 14, 2001 || Socorro || LINEAR || — || align=right | 5.4 km || 
|-id=016 bgcolor=#fefefe
| 89016 ||  || — || October 14, 2001 || Socorro || LINEAR || — || align=right | 1.5 km || 
|-id=017 bgcolor=#fefefe
| 89017 ||  || — || October 14, 2001 || Socorro || LINEAR || — || align=right | 1.2 km || 
|-id=018 bgcolor=#fefefe
| 89018 ||  || — || October 14, 2001 || Socorro || LINEAR || — || align=right | 1.7 km || 
|-id=019 bgcolor=#E9E9E9
| 89019 ||  || — || October 14, 2001 || Socorro || LINEAR || — || align=right | 5.4 km || 
|-id=020 bgcolor=#E9E9E9
| 89020 ||  || — || October 14, 2001 || Socorro || LINEAR || — || align=right | 1.7 km || 
|-id=021 bgcolor=#E9E9E9
| 89021 ||  || — || October 14, 2001 || Socorro || LINEAR || VIB || align=right | 5.8 km || 
|-id=022 bgcolor=#E9E9E9
| 89022 ||  || — || October 14, 2001 || Socorro || LINEAR || HOF || align=right | 5.0 km || 
|-id=023 bgcolor=#E9E9E9
| 89023 ||  || — || October 14, 2001 || Socorro || LINEAR || — || align=right | 1.9 km || 
|-id=024 bgcolor=#E9E9E9
| 89024 ||  || — || October 14, 2001 || Socorro || LINEAR || — || align=right | 6.3 km || 
|-id=025 bgcolor=#fefefe
| 89025 ||  || — || October 14, 2001 || Socorro || LINEAR || — || align=right | 1.8 km || 
|-id=026 bgcolor=#E9E9E9
| 89026 ||  || — || October 15, 2001 || Socorro || LINEAR || — || align=right | 3.9 km || 
|-id=027 bgcolor=#d6d6d6
| 89027 ||  || — || October 15, 2001 || Socorro || LINEAR || ALA || align=right | 9.8 km || 
|-id=028 bgcolor=#E9E9E9
| 89028 ||  || — || October 13, 2001 || Socorro || LINEAR || HEN || align=right | 2.7 km || 
|-id=029 bgcolor=#fefefe
| 89029 ||  || — || October 13, 2001 || Socorro || LINEAR || — || align=right | 1.5 km || 
|-id=030 bgcolor=#fefefe
| 89030 ||  || — || October 13, 2001 || Socorro || LINEAR || V || align=right | 1.8 km || 
|-id=031 bgcolor=#fefefe
| 89031 ||  || — || October 13, 2001 || Socorro || LINEAR || — || align=right | 2.8 km || 
|-id=032 bgcolor=#fefefe
| 89032 ||  || — || October 13, 2001 || Socorro || LINEAR || FLO || align=right | 2.4 km || 
|-id=033 bgcolor=#fefefe
| 89033 ||  || — || October 13, 2001 || Socorro || LINEAR || NYS || align=right | 2.4 km || 
|-id=034 bgcolor=#fefefe
| 89034 ||  || — || October 13, 2001 || Socorro || LINEAR || — || align=right | 2.6 km || 
|-id=035 bgcolor=#E9E9E9
| 89035 ||  || — || October 13, 2001 || Socorro || LINEAR || — || align=right | 3.6 km || 
|-id=036 bgcolor=#E9E9E9
| 89036 ||  || — || October 13, 2001 || Socorro || LINEAR || — || align=right | 2.2 km || 
|-id=037 bgcolor=#fefefe
| 89037 ||  || — || October 13, 2001 || Socorro || LINEAR || FLO || align=right | 2.8 km || 
|-id=038 bgcolor=#d6d6d6
| 89038 ||  || — || October 14, 2001 || Socorro || LINEAR || — || align=right | 6.2 km || 
|-id=039 bgcolor=#E9E9E9
| 89039 ||  || — || October 14, 2001 || Socorro || LINEAR || WIT || align=right | 2.5 km || 
|-id=040 bgcolor=#E9E9E9
| 89040 ||  || — || October 14, 2001 || Socorro || LINEAR || — || align=right | 2.1 km || 
|-id=041 bgcolor=#d6d6d6
| 89041 ||  || — || October 14, 2001 || Socorro || LINEAR || — || align=right | 6.4 km || 
|-id=042 bgcolor=#fefefe
| 89042 ||  || — || October 14, 2001 || Socorro || LINEAR || — || align=right | 2.0 km || 
|-id=043 bgcolor=#fefefe
| 89043 ||  || — || October 14, 2001 || Socorro || LINEAR || — || align=right | 1.8 km || 
|-id=044 bgcolor=#E9E9E9
| 89044 ||  || — || October 14, 2001 || Socorro || LINEAR || — || align=right | 3.7 km || 
|-id=045 bgcolor=#E9E9E9
| 89045 ||  || — || October 14, 2001 || Socorro || LINEAR || — || align=right | 1.9 km || 
|-id=046 bgcolor=#fefefe
| 89046 ||  || — || October 14, 2001 || Socorro || LINEAR || — || align=right | 1.9 km || 
|-id=047 bgcolor=#d6d6d6
| 89047 ||  || — || October 14, 2001 || Socorro || LINEAR || EOS || align=right | 4.4 km || 
|-id=048 bgcolor=#E9E9E9
| 89048 ||  || — || October 14, 2001 || Socorro || LINEAR || — || align=right | 6.2 km || 
|-id=049 bgcolor=#fefefe
| 89049 ||  || — || October 14, 2001 || Socorro || LINEAR || V || align=right | 2.0 km || 
|-id=050 bgcolor=#d6d6d6
| 89050 ||  || — || October 14, 2001 || Socorro || LINEAR || — || align=right | 7.7 km || 
|-id=051 bgcolor=#E9E9E9
| 89051 ||  || — || October 15, 2001 || Socorro || LINEAR || GER || align=right | 3.3 km || 
|-id=052 bgcolor=#E9E9E9
| 89052 ||  || — || October 15, 2001 || Socorro || LINEAR || — || align=right | 3.7 km || 
|-id=053 bgcolor=#E9E9E9
| 89053 ||  || — || October 15, 2001 || Socorro || LINEAR || EUN || align=right | 3.1 km || 
|-id=054 bgcolor=#fefefe
| 89054 ||  || — || October 15, 2001 || Socorro || LINEAR || FLO || align=right | 1.1 km || 
|-id=055 bgcolor=#fefefe
| 89055 ||  || — || October 12, 2001 || Haleakala || NEAT || — || align=right | 1.9 km || 
|-id=056 bgcolor=#fefefe
| 89056 ||  || — || October 12, 2001 || Haleakala || NEAT || — || align=right | 1.8 km || 
|-id=057 bgcolor=#fefefe
| 89057 ||  || — || October 12, 2001 || Bergisch Gladbach || W. Bickel || V || align=right | 2.7 km || 
|-id=058 bgcolor=#E9E9E9
| 89058 ||  || — || October 8, 2001 || Palomar || NEAT || — || align=right | 4.1 km || 
|-id=059 bgcolor=#E9E9E9
| 89059 ||  || — || October 10, 2001 || Palomar || NEAT || — || align=right | 3.3 km || 
|-id=060 bgcolor=#E9E9E9
| 89060 ||  || — || October 12, 2001 || Haleakala || NEAT || — || align=right | 3.7 km || 
|-id=061 bgcolor=#E9E9E9
| 89061 ||  || — || October 13, 2001 || Palomar || NEAT || — || align=right | 5.2 km || 
|-id=062 bgcolor=#d6d6d6
| 89062 ||  || — || October 13, 2001 || Palomar || NEAT || — || align=right | 5.9 km || 
|-id=063 bgcolor=#E9E9E9
| 89063 ||  || — || October 10, 2001 || Palomar || NEAT || ADE || align=right | 6.7 km || 
|-id=064 bgcolor=#fefefe
| 89064 ||  || — || October 10, 2001 || Palomar || NEAT || V || align=right | 1.4 km || 
|-id=065 bgcolor=#fefefe
| 89065 ||  || — || October 10, 2001 || Palomar || NEAT || — || align=right | 1.2 km || 
|-id=066 bgcolor=#E9E9E9
| 89066 ||  || — || October 10, 2001 || Palomar || NEAT || NEM || align=right | 3.9 km || 
|-id=067 bgcolor=#E9E9E9
| 89067 ||  || — || October 10, 2001 || Palomar || NEAT || PAD || align=right | 3.8 km || 
|-id=068 bgcolor=#E9E9E9
| 89068 ||  || — || October 10, 2001 || Palomar || NEAT || — || align=right | 2.2 km || 
|-id=069 bgcolor=#E9E9E9
| 89069 ||  || — || October 10, 2001 || Palomar || NEAT || — || align=right | 4.6 km || 
|-id=070 bgcolor=#fefefe
| 89070 ||  || — || October 10, 2001 || Palomar || NEAT || — || align=right | 1.9 km || 
|-id=071 bgcolor=#fefefe
| 89071 ||  || — || October 10, 2001 || Palomar || NEAT || — || align=right | 2.0 km || 
|-id=072 bgcolor=#d6d6d6
| 89072 ||  || — || October 10, 2001 || Palomar || NEAT || — || align=right | 5.8 km || 
|-id=073 bgcolor=#E9E9E9
| 89073 ||  || — || October 10, 2001 || Palomar || NEAT || — || align=right | 2.1 km || 
|-id=074 bgcolor=#E9E9E9
| 89074 ||  || — || October 15, 2001 || Palomar || NEAT || KRM || align=right | 4.3 km || 
|-id=075 bgcolor=#fefefe
| 89075 ||  || — || October 10, 2001 || Palomar || NEAT || — || align=right | 1.3 km || 
|-id=076 bgcolor=#E9E9E9
| 89076 ||  || — || October 10, 2001 || Palomar || NEAT || — || align=right | 4.5 km || 
|-id=077 bgcolor=#d6d6d6
| 89077 ||  || — || October 12, 2001 || Haleakala || NEAT || BRA || align=right | 2.9 km || 
|-id=078 bgcolor=#fefefe
| 89078 ||  || — || October 11, 2001 || Palomar || NEAT || — || align=right | 1.9 km || 
|-id=079 bgcolor=#d6d6d6
| 89079 ||  || — || October 14, 2001 || Socorro || LINEAR || — || align=right | 5.3 km || 
|-id=080 bgcolor=#fefefe
| 89080 ||  || — || October 14, 2001 || Socorro || LINEAR || FLO || align=right | 2.9 km || 
|-id=081 bgcolor=#fefefe
| 89081 ||  || — || October 14, 2001 || Socorro || LINEAR || — || align=right | 2.5 km || 
|-id=082 bgcolor=#fefefe
| 89082 ||  || — || October 15, 2001 || Socorro || LINEAR || — || align=right | 2.3 km || 
|-id=083 bgcolor=#fefefe
| 89083 ||  || — || October 15, 2001 || Socorro || LINEAR || — || align=right | 1.7 km || 
|-id=084 bgcolor=#E9E9E9
| 89084 ||  || — || October 15, 2001 || Palomar || NEAT || — || align=right | 2.1 km || 
|-id=085 bgcolor=#fefefe
| 89085 ||  || — || October 13, 2001 || Anderson Mesa || LONEOS || — || align=right | 3.6 km || 
|-id=086 bgcolor=#E9E9E9
| 89086 ||  || — || October 13, 2001 || Socorro || LINEAR || HOF || align=right | 5.0 km || 
|-id=087 bgcolor=#E9E9E9
| 89087 ||  || — || October 15, 2001 || Socorro || LINEAR || — || align=right | 7.6 km || 
|-id=088 bgcolor=#E9E9E9
| 89088 ||  || — || October 14, 2001 || Socorro || LINEAR || — || align=right | 2.8 km || 
|-id=089 bgcolor=#fefefe
| 89089 ||  || — || October 14, 2001 || Socorro || LINEAR || V || align=right | 1.4 km || 
|-id=090 bgcolor=#fefefe
| 89090 ||  || — || October 14, 2001 || Socorro || LINEAR || FLO || align=right | 1.2 km || 
|-id=091 bgcolor=#fefefe
| 89091 ||  || — || October 14, 2001 || Socorro || LINEAR || — || align=right | 2.7 km || 
|-id=092 bgcolor=#fefefe
| 89092 ||  || — || October 14, 2001 || Socorro || LINEAR || — || align=right | 1.3 km || 
|-id=093 bgcolor=#fefefe
| 89093 ||  || — || October 14, 2001 || Socorro || LINEAR || FLO || align=right | 1.9 km || 
|-id=094 bgcolor=#fefefe
| 89094 ||  || — || October 14, 2001 || Socorro || LINEAR || FLO || align=right | 1.3 km || 
|-id=095 bgcolor=#fefefe
| 89095 ||  || — || October 14, 2001 || Socorro || LINEAR || V || align=right | 1.7 km || 
|-id=096 bgcolor=#fefefe
| 89096 ||  || — || October 14, 2001 || Socorro || LINEAR || FLO || align=right | 2.8 km || 
|-id=097 bgcolor=#fefefe
| 89097 ||  || — || October 14, 2001 || Socorro || LINEAR || — || align=right | 1.6 km || 
|-id=098 bgcolor=#fefefe
| 89098 ||  || — || October 14, 2001 || Socorro || LINEAR || V || align=right | 2.0 km || 
|-id=099 bgcolor=#fefefe
| 89099 ||  || — || October 14, 2001 || Socorro || LINEAR || — || align=right | 2.7 km || 
|-id=100 bgcolor=#fefefe
| 89100 ||  || — || October 15, 2001 || Socorro || LINEAR || V || align=right | 1.4 km || 
|}

89101–89200 

|-bgcolor=#fefefe
| 89101 ||  || — || October 11, 2001 || Socorro || LINEAR || — || align=right | 1.5 km || 
|-id=102 bgcolor=#E9E9E9
| 89102 ||  || — || October 11, 2001 || Socorro || LINEAR || — || align=right | 2.2 km || 
|-id=103 bgcolor=#E9E9E9
| 89103 ||  || — || October 11, 2001 || Socorro || LINEAR || — || align=right | 2.7 km || 
|-id=104 bgcolor=#d6d6d6
| 89104 ||  || — || October 11, 2001 || Socorro || LINEAR || EOS || align=right | 3.9 km || 
|-id=105 bgcolor=#E9E9E9
| 89105 ||  || — || October 11, 2001 || Socorro || LINEAR || MAR || align=right | 2.9 km || 
|-id=106 bgcolor=#fefefe
| 89106 ||  || — || October 11, 2001 || Socorro || LINEAR || — || align=right | 1.6 km || 
|-id=107 bgcolor=#d6d6d6
| 89107 ||  || — || October 11, 2001 || Socorro || LINEAR || — || align=right | 8.2 km || 
|-id=108 bgcolor=#d6d6d6
| 89108 ||  || — || October 11, 2001 || Palomar || NEAT || THM || align=right | 4.9 km || 
|-id=109 bgcolor=#fefefe
| 89109 ||  || — || October 13, 2001 || Anderson Mesa || LONEOS || — || align=right | 3.6 km || 
|-id=110 bgcolor=#d6d6d6
| 89110 ||  || — || October 13, 2001 || Palomar || NEAT || — || align=right | 6.9 km || 
|-id=111 bgcolor=#E9E9E9
| 89111 ||  || — || October 13, 2001 || Palomar || NEAT || MAR || align=right | 2.2 km || 
|-id=112 bgcolor=#fefefe
| 89112 ||  || — || October 13, 2001 || Socorro || LINEAR || FLO || align=right | 2.5 km || 
|-id=113 bgcolor=#fefefe
| 89113 ||  || — || October 13, 2001 || Anderson Mesa || LONEOS || — || align=right | 2.1 km || 
|-id=114 bgcolor=#fefefe
| 89114 ||  || — || October 14, 2001 || Anderson Mesa || LONEOS || V || align=right | 1.6 km || 
|-id=115 bgcolor=#fefefe
| 89115 ||  || — || October 14, 2001 || Socorro || LINEAR || — || align=right | 2.2 km || 
|-id=116 bgcolor=#E9E9E9
| 89116 ||  || — || October 14, 2001 || Socorro || LINEAR || — || align=right | 1.7 km || 
|-id=117 bgcolor=#E9E9E9
| 89117 ||  || — || October 14, 2001 || Socorro || LINEAR || EUN || align=right | 2.6 km || 
|-id=118 bgcolor=#E9E9E9
| 89118 ||  || — || October 15, 2001 || Palomar || NEAT || GEF || align=right | 2.2 km || 
|-id=119 bgcolor=#E9E9E9
| 89119 ||  || — || October 15, 2001 || Palomar || NEAT || — || align=right | 3.9 km || 
|-id=120 bgcolor=#E9E9E9
| 89120 ||  || — || October 15, 2001 || Palomar || NEAT || — || align=right | 3.7 km || 
|-id=121 bgcolor=#fefefe
| 89121 ||  || — || October 15, 2001 || Palomar || NEAT || — || align=right | 1.9 km || 
|-id=122 bgcolor=#fefefe
| 89122 ||  || — || October 18, 2001 || Desert Eagle || W. K. Y. Yeung || — || align=right | 1.9 km || 
|-id=123 bgcolor=#fefefe
| 89123 ||  || — || October 18, 2001 || Desert Eagle || W. K. Y. Yeung || V || align=right | 1.4 km || 
|-id=124 bgcolor=#d6d6d6
| 89124 ||  || — || October 16, 2001 || Socorro || LINEAR || EMA || align=right | 5.9 km || 
|-id=125 bgcolor=#E9E9E9
| 89125 ||  || — || October 16, 2001 || Socorro || LINEAR || — || align=right | 3.5 km || 
|-id=126 bgcolor=#E9E9E9
| 89126 ||  || — || October 17, 2001 || Desert Eagle || W. K. Y. Yeung || — || align=right | 2.9 km || 
|-id=127 bgcolor=#fefefe
| 89127 ||  || — || October 17, 2001 || Desert Eagle || W. K. Y. Yeung || V || align=right | 2.1 km || 
|-id=128 bgcolor=#E9E9E9
| 89128 ||  || — || October 17, 2001 || Socorro || LINEAR || EUN || align=right | 3.2 km || 
|-id=129 bgcolor=#E9E9E9
| 89129 ||  || — || October 17, 2001 || Socorro || LINEAR || — || align=right | 2.0 km || 
|-id=130 bgcolor=#d6d6d6
| 89130 ||  || — || October 20, 2001 || Powell || Powell Obs. || — || align=right | 6.7 km || 
|-id=131 bgcolor=#fefefe
| 89131 Phildevries ||  ||  || October 23, 2001 || Desert Eagle || W. K. Y. Yeung || — || align=right | 2.3 km || 
|-id=132 bgcolor=#fefefe
| 89132 ||  || — || October 24, 2001 || Desert Eagle || W. K. Y. Yeung || — || align=right | 1.8 km || 
|-id=133 bgcolor=#fefefe
| 89133 ||  || — || October 24, 2001 || Desert Eagle || W. K. Y. Yeung || — || align=right | 2.8 km || 
|-id=134 bgcolor=#E9E9E9
| 89134 ||  || — || October 25, 2001 || Desert Eagle || W. K. Y. Yeung || — || align=right | 3.3 km || 
|-id=135 bgcolor=#fefefe
| 89135 ||  || — || October 25, 2001 || Desert Eagle || W. K. Y. Yeung || CLA || align=right | 5.1 km || 
|-id=136 bgcolor=#FFC2E0
| 89136 ||  || — || October 23, 2001 || Kitt Peak || Spacewatch || APOPHA || align=right data-sort-value="0.32" | 320 m || 
|-id=137 bgcolor=#FA8072
| 89137 ||  || — || October 17, 2001 || Socorro || LINEAR || — || align=right | 1.6 km || 
|-id=138 bgcolor=#d6d6d6
| 89138 ||  || — || October 17, 2001 || Kitt Peak || Spacewatch || — || align=right | 4.8 km || 
|-id=139 bgcolor=#fefefe
| 89139 ||  || — || October 18, 2001 || Palomar || NEAT || NYS || align=right | 1.2 km || 
|-id=140 bgcolor=#E9E9E9
| 89140 ||  || — || October 17, 2001 || Socorro || LINEAR || EUN || align=right | 3.2 km || 
|-id=141 bgcolor=#d6d6d6
| 89141 ||  || — || October 18, 2001 || Socorro || LINEAR || — || align=right | 7.5 km || 
|-id=142 bgcolor=#fefefe
| 89142 ||  || — || October 18, 2001 || Socorro || LINEAR || — || align=right | 3.3 km || 
|-id=143 bgcolor=#fefefe
| 89143 ||  || — || October 16, 2001 || Socorro || LINEAR || V || align=right | 1.4 km || 
|-id=144 bgcolor=#E9E9E9
| 89144 ||  || — || October 16, 2001 || Socorro || LINEAR || — || align=right | 2.9 km || 
|-id=145 bgcolor=#fefefe
| 89145 ||  || — || October 16, 2001 || Socorro || LINEAR || FLO || align=right | 1.5 km || 
|-id=146 bgcolor=#E9E9E9
| 89146 ||  || — || October 16, 2001 || Socorro || LINEAR || — || align=right | 4.2 km || 
|-id=147 bgcolor=#E9E9E9
| 89147 ||  || — || October 16, 2001 || Socorro || LINEAR || WIT || align=right | 2.7 km || 
|-id=148 bgcolor=#d6d6d6
| 89148 ||  || — || October 16, 2001 || Socorro || LINEAR || — || align=right | 5.7 km || 
|-id=149 bgcolor=#fefefe
| 89149 ||  || — || October 16, 2001 || Socorro || LINEAR || V || align=right | 1.6 km || 
|-id=150 bgcolor=#E9E9E9
| 89150 ||  || — || October 16, 2001 || Socorro || LINEAR || — || align=right | 3.5 km || 
|-id=151 bgcolor=#fefefe
| 89151 ||  || — || October 16, 2001 || Socorro || LINEAR || V || align=right | 1.4 km || 
|-id=152 bgcolor=#E9E9E9
| 89152 ||  || — || October 16, 2001 || Socorro || LINEAR || — || align=right | 3.5 km || 
|-id=153 bgcolor=#fefefe
| 89153 ||  || — || October 17, 2001 || Socorro || LINEAR || NYS || align=right | 1.2 km || 
|-id=154 bgcolor=#E9E9E9
| 89154 ||  || — || October 17, 2001 || Socorro || LINEAR || AST || align=right | 3.9 km || 
|-id=155 bgcolor=#E9E9E9
| 89155 ||  || — || October 17, 2001 || Socorro || LINEAR || WIT || align=right | 1.9 km || 
|-id=156 bgcolor=#E9E9E9
| 89156 ||  || — || October 17, 2001 || Socorro || LINEAR || WIT || align=right | 1.6 km || 
|-id=157 bgcolor=#fefefe
| 89157 ||  || — || October 17, 2001 || Socorro || LINEAR || FLO || align=right | 1.5 km || 
|-id=158 bgcolor=#fefefe
| 89158 ||  || — || October 17, 2001 || Socorro || LINEAR || FLO || align=right | 1.5 km || 
|-id=159 bgcolor=#E9E9E9
| 89159 ||  || — || October 17, 2001 || Socorro || LINEAR || — || align=right | 4.6 km || 
|-id=160 bgcolor=#fefefe
| 89160 ||  || — || October 17, 2001 || Socorro || LINEAR || — || align=right | 1.4 km || 
|-id=161 bgcolor=#fefefe
| 89161 ||  || — || October 17, 2001 || Socorro || LINEAR || — || align=right | 1.9 km || 
|-id=162 bgcolor=#d6d6d6
| 89162 ||  || — || October 17, 2001 || Socorro || LINEAR || — || align=right | 4.9 km || 
|-id=163 bgcolor=#E9E9E9
| 89163 ||  || — || October 17, 2001 || Socorro || LINEAR || — || align=right | 4.2 km || 
|-id=164 bgcolor=#d6d6d6
| 89164 ||  || — || October 17, 2001 || Socorro || LINEAR || EOS || align=right | 4.3 km || 
|-id=165 bgcolor=#fefefe
| 89165 ||  || — || October 17, 2001 || Socorro || LINEAR || — || align=right | 1.5 km || 
|-id=166 bgcolor=#E9E9E9
| 89166 ||  || — || October 17, 2001 || Socorro || LINEAR || MAR || align=right | 2.9 km || 
|-id=167 bgcolor=#d6d6d6
| 89167 ||  || — || October 17, 2001 || Socorro || LINEAR || — || align=right | 7.3 km || 
|-id=168 bgcolor=#fefefe
| 89168 ||  || — || October 17, 2001 || Socorro || LINEAR || V || align=right | 1.4 km || 
|-id=169 bgcolor=#fefefe
| 89169 ||  || — || October 17, 2001 || Socorro || LINEAR || — || align=right | 2.5 km || 
|-id=170 bgcolor=#E9E9E9
| 89170 ||  || — || October 17, 2001 || Socorro || LINEAR || — || align=right | 3.5 km || 
|-id=171 bgcolor=#E9E9E9
| 89171 ||  || — || October 16, 2001 || Socorro || LINEAR || AGN || align=right | 2.5 km || 
|-id=172 bgcolor=#E9E9E9
| 89172 ||  || — || October 16, 2001 || Socorro || LINEAR || — || align=right | 2.7 km || 
|-id=173 bgcolor=#d6d6d6
| 89173 ||  || — || October 17, 2001 || Socorro || LINEAR || TIR || align=right | 7.5 km || 
|-id=174 bgcolor=#fefefe
| 89174 ||  || — || October 17, 2001 || Socorro || LINEAR || FLO || align=right | 2.1 km || 
|-id=175 bgcolor=#d6d6d6
| 89175 ||  || — || October 17, 2001 || Socorro || LINEAR || 7:4 || align=right | 4.2 km || 
|-id=176 bgcolor=#fefefe
| 89176 ||  || — || October 17, 2001 || Socorro || LINEAR || — || align=right | 1.6 km || 
|-id=177 bgcolor=#fefefe
| 89177 ||  || — || October 17, 2001 || Socorro || LINEAR || NYS || align=right | 2.3 km || 
|-id=178 bgcolor=#E9E9E9
| 89178 ||  || — || October 18, 2001 || Socorro || LINEAR || — || align=right | 2.9 km || 
|-id=179 bgcolor=#fefefe
| 89179 ||  || — || October 18, 2001 || Socorro || LINEAR || — || align=right | 2.2 km || 
|-id=180 bgcolor=#E9E9E9
| 89180 ||  || — || October 18, 2001 || Socorro || LINEAR || — || align=right | 5.7 km || 
|-id=181 bgcolor=#fefefe
| 89181 ||  || — || October 18, 2001 || Socorro || LINEAR || FLO || align=right | 1.3 km || 
|-id=182 bgcolor=#d6d6d6
| 89182 ||  || — || October 20, 2001 || Socorro || LINEAR || slow || align=right | 8.3 km || 
|-id=183 bgcolor=#fefefe
| 89183 ||  || — || October 17, 2001 || Kitt Peak || Spacewatch || NYS || align=right | 2.8 km || 
|-id=184 bgcolor=#fefefe
| 89184 ||  || — || October 17, 2001 || Socorro || LINEAR || — || align=right | 2.1 km || 
|-id=185 bgcolor=#E9E9E9
| 89185 ||  || — || October 17, 2001 || Socorro || LINEAR || HOF || align=right | 5.4 km || 
|-id=186 bgcolor=#d6d6d6
| 89186 ||  || — || October 17, 2001 || Socorro || LINEAR || KOR || align=right | 2.9 km || 
|-id=187 bgcolor=#fefefe
| 89187 ||  || — || October 17, 2001 || Socorro || LINEAR || FLO || align=right | 1.3 km || 
|-id=188 bgcolor=#fefefe
| 89188 ||  || — || October 17, 2001 || Socorro || LINEAR || FLO || align=right | 1.2 km || 
|-id=189 bgcolor=#fefefe
| 89189 ||  || — || October 17, 2001 || Socorro || LINEAR || — || align=right | 1.9 km || 
|-id=190 bgcolor=#fefefe
| 89190 ||  || — || October 17, 2001 || Socorro || LINEAR || V || align=right | 1.4 km || 
|-id=191 bgcolor=#E9E9E9
| 89191 ||  || — || October 17, 2001 || Socorro || LINEAR || — || align=right | 4.7 km || 
|-id=192 bgcolor=#fefefe
| 89192 ||  || — || October 17, 2001 || Socorro || LINEAR || FLO || align=right | 2.3 km || 
|-id=193 bgcolor=#fefefe
| 89193 ||  || — || October 18, 2001 || Socorro || LINEAR || — || align=right | 3.3 km || 
|-id=194 bgcolor=#fefefe
| 89194 ||  || — || October 20, 2001 || Socorro || LINEAR || — || align=right | 2.0 km || 
|-id=195 bgcolor=#fefefe
| 89195 ||  || — || October 20, 2001 || Socorro || LINEAR || FLO || align=right | 1.2 km || 
|-id=196 bgcolor=#d6d6d6
| 89196 ||  || — || October 20, 2001 || Socorro || LINEAR || — || align=right | 4.8 km || 
|-id=197 bgcolor=#d6d6d6
| 89197 ||  || — || October 20, 2001 || Socorro || LINEAR || KOR || align=right | 3.0 km || 
|-id=198 bgcolor=#fefefe
| 89198 ||  || — || October 20, 2001 || Socorro || LINEAR || — || align=right | 2.5 km || 
|-id=199 bgcolor=#E9E9E9
| 89199 ||  || — || October 20, 2001 || Socorro || LINEAR || — || align=right | 2.0 km || 
|-id=200 bgcolor=#fefefe
| 89200 ||  || — || October 21, 2001 || Socorro || LINEAR || — || align=right | 2.2 km || 
|}

89201–89300 

|-bgcolor=#fefefe
| 89201 ||  || — || October 16, 2001 || Kitt Peak || Spacewatch || NYS || align=right | 1.7 km || 
|-id=202 bgcolor=#d6d6d6
| 89202 ||  || — || October 21, 2001 || Kitt Peak || Spacewatch || — || align=right | 5.1 km || 
|-id=203 bgcolor=#E9E9E9
| 89203 ||  || — || October 19, 2001 || Haleakala || NEAT || — || align=right | 3.9 km || 
|-id=204 bgcolor=#E9E9E9
| 89204 ||  || — || October 19, 2001 || Haleakala || NEAT || — || align=right | 3.5 km || 
|-id=205 bgcolor=#fefefe
| 89205 ||  || — || October 19, 2001 || Haleakala || NEAT || — || align=right | 1.9 km || 
|-id=206 bgcolor=#d6d6d6
| 89206 ||  || — || October 17, 2001 || Socorro || LINEAR || — || align=right | 4.9 km || 
|-id=207 bgcolor=#E9E9E9
| 89207 ||  || — || October 17, 2001 || Socorro || LINEAR || — || align=right | 2.1 km || 
|-id=208 bgcolor=#d6d6d6
| 89208 ||  || — || October 20, 2001 || Socorro || LINEAR || — || align=right | 5.1 km || 
|-id=209 bgcolor=#E9E9E9
| 89209 ||  || — || October 20, 2001 || Socorro || LINEAR || — || align=right | 5.1 km || 
|-id=210 bgcolor=#d6d6d6
| 89210 ||  || — || October 20, 2001 || Socorro || LINEAR || KOR || align=right | 2.4 km || 
|-id=211 bgcolor=#d6d6d6
| 89211 ||  || — || October 20, 2001 || Socorro || LINEAR || CHA || align=right | 3.9 km || 
|-id=212 bgcolor=#E9E9E9
| 89212 ||  || — || October 20, 2001 || Socorro || LINEAR || — || align=right | 2.1 km || 
|-id=213 bgcolor=#E9E9E9
| 89213 ||  || — || October 20, 2001 || Socorro || LINEAR || MRX || align=right | 2.5 km || 
|-id=214 bgcolor=#E9E9E9
| 89214 ||  || — || October 21, 2001 || Socorro || LINEAR || — || align=right | 4.5 km || 
|-id=215 bgcolor=#E9E9E9
| 89215 ||  || — || October 22, 2001 || Socorro || LINEAR || — || align=right | 4.7 km || 
|-id=216 bgcolor=#fefefe
| 89216 ||  || — || October 22, 2001 || Socorro || LINEAR || — || align=right | 2.8 km || 
|-id=217 bgcolor=#d6d6d6
| 89217 ||  || — || October 22, 2001 || Socorro || LINEAR || THM || align=right | 6.5 km || 
|-id=218 bgcolor=#E9E9E9
| 89218 ||  || — || October 22, 2001 || Socorro || LINEAR || NEM || align=right | 5.3 km || 
|-id=219 bgcolor=#E9E9E9
| 89219 ||  || — || October 22, 2001 || Socorro || LINEAR || — || align=right | 1.7 km || 
|-id=220 bgcolor=#E9E9E9
| 89220 ||  || — || October 22, 2001 || Socorro || LINEAR || — || align=right | 3.9 km || 
|-id=221 bgcolor=#E9E9E9
| 89221 ||  || — || October 22, 2001 || Socorro || LINEAR || — || align=right | 3.2 km || 
|-id=222 bgcolor=#fefefe
| 89222 ||  || — || October 22, 2001 || Socorro || LINEAR || — || align=right | 2.0 km || 
|-id=223 bgcolor=#fefefe
| 89223 ||  || — || October 22, 2001 || Socorro || LINEAR || — || align=right | 1.5 km || 
|-id=224 bgcolor=#E9E9E9
| 89224 ||  || — || October 22, 2001 || Palomar || NEAT || EUN || align=right | 3.0 km || 
|-id=225 bgcolor=#d6d6d6
| 89225 ||  || — || October 23, 2001 || Palomar || NEAT || — || align=right | 5.3 km || 
|-id=226 bgcolor=#E9E9E9
| 89226 ||  || — || October 17, 2001 || Socorro || LINEAR || PAD || align=right | 4.0 km || 
|-id=227 bgcolor=#E9E9E9
| 89227 ||  || — || October 17, 2001 || Socorro || LINEAR || — || align=right | 3.7 km || 
|-id=228 bgcolor=#E9E9E9
| 89228 ||  || — || October 17, 2001 || Socorro || LINEAR || — || align=right | 5.9 km || 
|-id=229 bgcolor=#d6d6d6
| 89229 ||  || — || October 17, 2001 || Socorro || LINEAR || — || align=right | 7.8 km || 
|-id=230 bgcolor=#d6d6d6
| 89230 ||  || — || October 20, 2001 || Socorro || LINEAR || — || align=right | 5.8 km || 
|-id=231 bgcolor=#d6d6d6
| 89231 ||  || — || October 23, 2001 || Socorro || LINEAR || — || align=right | 4.1 km || 
|-id=232 bgcolor=#fefefe
| 89232 ||  || — || October 23, 2001 || Socorro || LINEAR || NYS || align=right | 1.7 km || 
|-id=233 bgcolor=#E9E9E9
| 89233 ||  || — || October 23, 2001 || Socorro || LINEAR || — || align=right | 3.0 km || 
|-id=234 bgcolor=#E9E9E9
| 89234 ||  || — || October 23, 2001 || Socorro || LINEAR || — || align=right | 1.7 km || 
|-id=235 bgcolor=#d6d6d6
| 89235 ||  || — || October 23, 2001 || Socorro || LINEAR || KOR || align=right | 2.6 km || 
|-id=236 bgcolor=#fefefe
| 89236 ||  || — || October 23, 2001 || Socorro || LINEAR || — || align=right | 1.8 km || 
|-id=237 bgcolor=#E9E9E9
| 89237 ||  || — || October 23, 2001 || Socorro || LINEAR || GER || align=right | 4.9 km || 
|-id=238 bgcolor=#fefefe
| 89238 ||  || — || October 23, 2001 || Socorro || LINEAR || Vfast? || align=right | 1.5 km || 
|-id=239 bgcolor=#d6d6d6
| 89239 ||  || — || October 23, 2001 || Socorro || LINEAR || KOR || align=right | 2.7 km || 
|-id=240 bgcolor=#E9E9E9
| 89240 ||  || — || October 23, 2001 || Socorro || LINEAR || — || align=right | 1.8 km || 
|-id=241 bgcolor=#d6d6d6
| 89241 ||  || — || October 23, 2001 || Socorro || LINEAR || EOS || align=right | 3.7 km || 
|-id=242 bgcolor=#E9E9E9
| 89242 ||  || — || October 23, 2001 || Socorro || LINEAR || PAD || align=right | 3.4 km || 
|-id=243 bgcolor=#d6d6d6
| 89243 ||  || — || October 23, 2001 || Socorro || LINEAR || — || align=right | 4.9 km || 
|-id=244 bgcolor=#E9E9E9
| 89244 ||  || — || October 23, 2001 || Palomar || NEAT || — || align=right | 2.7 km || 
|-id=245 bgcolor=#E9E9E9
| 89245 ||  || — || October 19, 2001 || Socorro || LINEAR || — || align=right | 3.5 km || 
|-id=246 bgcolor=#fefefe
| 89246 ||  || — || October 19, 2001 || Socorro || LINEAR || — || align=right | 4.0 km || 
|-id=247 bgcolor=#E9E9E9
| 89247 ||  || — || October 19, 2001 || Socorro || LINEAR || — || align=right | 5.9 km || 
|-id=248 bgcolor=#d6d6d6
| 89248 ||  || — || October 20, 2001 || Socorro || LINEAR || — || align=right | 4.4 km || 
|-id=249 bgcolor=#fefefe
| 89249 ||  || — || October 21, 2001 || Socorro || LINEAR || NYS || align=right | 1.9 km || 
|-id=250 bgcolor=#fefefe
| 89250 ||  || — || October 18, 2001 || Palomar || NEAT || — || align=right | 4.2 km || 
|-id=251 bgcolor=#fefefe
| 89251 ||  || — || October 18, 2001 || Palomar || NEAT || MAS || align=right | 1.7 km || 
|-id=252 bgcolor=#E9E9E9
| 89252 ||  || — || October 21, 2001 || Socorro || LINEAR || — || align=right | 2.6 km || 
|-id=253 bgcolor=#E9E9E9
| 89253 ||  || — || October 23, 2001 || Palomar || NEAT || — || align=right | 2.6 km || 
|-id=254 bgcolor=#E9E9E9
| 89254 ||  || — || October 23, 2001 || Palomar || NEAT || GEF || align=right | 6.6 km || 
|-id=255 bgcolor=#d6d6d6
| 89255 ||  || — || October 26, 2001 || Palomar || NEAT || — || align=right | 4.7 km || 
|-id=256 bgcolor=#fefefe
| 89256 ||  || — || October 16, 2001 || Palomar || NEAT || FLO || align=right | 1.4 km || 
|-id=257 bgcolor=#d6d6d6
| 89257 ||  || — || October 16, 2001 || Kitt Peak || Spacewatch || THM || align=right | 5.9 km || 
|-id=258 bgcolor=#fefefe
| 89258 ||  || — || October 19, 2001 || Kitt Peak || Spacewatch || — || align=right | 3.7 km || 
|-id=259 bgcolor=#d6d6d6
| 89259 ||  || — || October 19, 2001 || Palomar || NEAT || — || align=right | 5.5 km || 
|-id=260 bgcolor=#E9E9E9
| 89260 ||  || — || October 23, 2001 || Anderson Mesa || LONEOS || MAR || align=right | 2.6 km || 
|-id=261 bgcolor=#E9E9E9
| 89261 || 2001 VO || — || November 7, 2001 || Socorro || LINEAR || HNS || align=right | 3.4 km || 
|-id=262 bgcolor=#fefefe
| 89262 ||  || — || November 9, 2001 || Socorro || LINEAR || — || align=right | 1.6 km || 
|-id=263 bgcolor=#fefefe
| 89263 ||  || — || November 10, 2001 || Starkenburg Observatory || Starkenburg Obs. || FLO || align=right | 2.1 km || 
|-id=264 bgcolor=#fefefe
| 89264 Sewanee ||  ||  || November 11, 2001 || Cordell-Lorenz || D. T. Durig || — || align=right | 2.0 km || 
|-id=265 bgcolor=#d6d6d6
| 89265 ||  || — || November 8, 2001 || Goodricke-Pigott || R. A. Tucker || — || align=right | 7.0 km || 
|-id=266 bgcolor=#d6d6d6
| 89266 ||  || — || November 9, 2001 || Socorro || LINEAR || — || align=right | 7.2 km || 
|-id=267 bgcolor=#d6d6d6
| 89267 ||  || — || November 9, 2001 || Socorro || LINEAR || — || align=right | 5.1 km || 
|-id=268 bgcolor=#fefefe
| 89268 ||  || — || November 9, 2001 || Socorro || LINEAR || — || align=right | 1.8 km || 
|-id=269 bgcolor=#fefefe
| 89269 ||  || — || November 9, 2001 || Socorro || LINEAR || — || align=right | 1.4 km || 
|-id=270 bgcolor=#fefefe
| 89270 ||  || — || November 10, 2001 || Socorro || LINEAR || — || align=right | 1.9 km || 
|-id=271 bgcolor=#fefefe
| 89271 ||  || — || November 10, 2001 || Socorro || LINEAR || V || align=right | 1.3 km || 
|-id=272 bgcolor=#E9E9E9
| 89272 ||  || — || November 10, 2001 || Socorro || LINEAR || EUN || align=right | 3.2 km || 
|-id=273 bgcolor=#fefefe
| 89273 ||  || — || November 10, 2001 || Socorro || LINEAR || PHO || align=right | 4.4 km || 
|-id=274 bgcolor=#E9E9E9
| 89274 ||  || — || November 10, 2001 || Socorro || LINEAR || — || align=right | 4.3 km || 
|-id=275 bgcolor=#fefefe
| 89275 ||  || — || November 10, 2001 || Socorro || LINEAR || — || align=right | 7.9 km || 
|-id=276 bgcolor=#fefefe
| 89276 ||  || — || November 10, 2001 || Socorro || LINEAR || V || align=right | 1.7 km || 
|-id=277 bgcolor=#E9E9E9
| 89277 ||  || — || November 7, 2001 || Palomar || NEAT || HNS || align=right | 2.9 km || 
|-id=278 bgcolor=#E9E9E9
| 89278 ||  || — || November 9, 2001 || Palomar || NEAT || — || align=right | 3.9 km || 
|-id=279 bgcolor=#fefefe
| 89279 ||  || — || November 10, 2001 || Palomar || NEAT || — || align=right | 1.6 km || 
|-id=280 bgcolor=#E9E9E9
| 89280 ||  || — || November 10, 2001 || Socorro || LINEAR || EUN || align=right | 2.6 km || 
|-id=281 bgcolor=#E9E9E9
| 89281 ||  || — || November 10, 2001 || Socorro || LINEAR || HNS || align=right | 3.1 km || 
|-id=282 bgcolor=#E9E9E9
| 89282 Suzieimber ||  ||  || November 10, 2001 || Ondřejov || P. Pravec, P. Kušnirák || — || align=right | 1.6 km || 
|-id=283 bgcolor=#d6d6d6
| 89283 ||  || — || November 11, 2001 || Goodricke-Pigott || R. A. Tucker || — || align=right | 10 km || 
|-id=284 bgcolor=#fefefe
| 89284 ||  || — || November 9, 2001 || Socorro || LINEAR || — || align=right | 1.4 km || 
|-id=285 bgcolor=#E9E9E9
| 89285 ||  || — || November 9, 2001 || Socorro || LINEAR || — || align=right | 2.7 km || 
|-id=286 bgcolor=#E9E9E9
| 89286 ||  || — || November 9, 2001 || Socorro || LINEAR || PAD || align=right | 5.2 km || 
|-id=287 bgcolor=#fefefe
| 89287 ||  || — || November 9, 2001 || Socorro || LINEAR || — || align=right | 1.6 km || 
|-id=288 bgcolor=#E9E9E9
| 89288 ||  || — || November 9, 2001 || Socorro || LINEAR || RAF || align=right | 2.5 km || 
|-id=289 bgcolor=#d6d6d6
| 89289 ||  || — || November 9, 2001 || Socorro || LINEAR || KOR || align=right | 3.5 km || 
|-id=290 bgcolor=#fefefe
| 89290 ||  || — || November 9, 2001 || Socorro || LINEAR || FLO || align=right | 1.4 km || 
|-id=291 bgcolor=#E9E9E9
| 89291 ||  || — || November 9, 2001 || Socorro || LINEAR || — || align=right | 6.1 km || 
|-id=292 bgcolor=#fefefe
| 89292 ||  || — || November 9, 2001 || Socorro || LINEAR || — || align=right | 2.0 km || 
|-id=293 bgcolor=#d6d6d6
| 89293 ||  || — || November 9, 2001 || Socorro || LINEAR || — || align=right | 5.1 km || 
|-id=294 bgcolor=#fefefe
| 89294 ||  || — || November 9, 2001 || Socorro || LINEAR || — || align=right | 1.9 km || 
|-id=295 bgcolor=#fefefe
| 89295 ||  || — || November 9, 2001 || Socorro || LINEAR || FLO || align=right | 1.3 km || 
|-id=296 bgcolor=#E9E9E9
| 89296 ||  || — || November 9, 2001 || Socorro || LINEAR || — || align=right | 3.0 km || 
|-id=297 bgcolor=#d6d6d6
| 89297 ||  || — || November 9, 2001 || Socorro || LINEAR || — || align=right | 5.6 km || 
|-id=298 bgcolor=#fefefe
| 89298 ||  || — || November 9, 2001 || Socorro || LINEAR || — || align=right | 4.2 km || 
|-id=299 bgcolor=#E9E9E9
| 89299 ||  || — || November 9, 2001 || Socorro || LINEAR || — || align=right | 2.8 km || 
|-id=300 bgcolor=#E9E9E9
| 89300 ||  || — || November 9, 2001 || Socorro || LINEAR || — || align=right | 2.4 km || 
|}

89301–89400 

|-bgcolor=#E9E9E9
| 89301 ||  || — || November 9, 2001 || Socorro || LINEAR || ADE || align=right | 5.8 km || 
|-id=302 bgcolor=#fefefe
| 89302 ||  || — || November 9, 2001 || Socorro || LINEAR || V || align=right | 1.6 km || 
|-id=303 bgcolor=#E9E9E9
| 89303 ||  || — || November 9, 2001 || Socorro || LINEAR || — || align=right | 6.4 km || 
|-id=304 bgcolor=#fefefe
| 89304 ||  || — || November 9, 2001 || Socorro || LINEAR || — || align=right | 1.9 km || 
|-id=305 bgcolor=#fefefe
| 89305 ||  || — || November 9, 2001 || Socorro || LINEAR || NYS || align=right | 1.6 km || 
|-id=306 bgcolor=#E9E9E9
| 89306 ||  || — || November 9, 2001 || Socorro || LINEAR || — || align=right | 3.4 km || 
|-id=307 bgcolor=#E9E9E9
| 89307 ||  || — || November 9, 2001 || Socorro || LINEAR || — || align=right | 3.4 km || 
|-id=308 bgcolor=#E9E9E9
| 89308 ||  || — || November 9, 2001 || Socorro || LINEAR || — || align=right | 2.8 km || 
|-id=309 bgcolor=#fefefe
| 89309 ||  || — || November 9, 2001 || Socorro || LINEAR || FLO || align=right | 1.3 km || 
|-id=310 bgcolor=#d6d6d6
| 89310 ||  || — || November 9, 2001 || Socorro || LINEAR || HYG || align=right | 6.4 km || 
|-id=311 bgcolor=#fefefe
| 89311 ||  || — || November 9, 2001 || Socorro || LINEAR || MAS || align=right | 1.7 km || 
|-id=312 bgcolor=#fefefe
| 89312 ||  || — || November 9, 2001 || Socorro || LINEAR || — || align=right | 2.1 km || 
|-id=313 bgcolor=#fefefe
| 89313 ||  || — || November 9, 2001 || Socorro || LINEAR || V || align=right | 1.4 km || 
|-id=314 bgcolor=#d6d6d6
| 89314 ||  || — || November 9, 2001 || Socorro || LINEAR || — || align=right | 6.6 km || 
|-id=315 bgcolor=#E9E9E9
| 89315 ||  || — || November 9, 2001 || Socorro || LINEAR || — || align=right | 2.8 km || 
|-id=316 bgcolor=#fefefe
| 89316 ||  || — || November 9, 2001 || Socorro || LINEAR || — || align=right | 1.4 km || 
|-id=317 bgcolor=#fefefe
| 89317 ||  || — || November 9, 2001 || Socorro || LINEAR || V || align=right | 1.5 km || 
|-id=318 bgcolor=#E9E9E9
| 89318 ||  || — || November 9, 2001 || Socorro || LINEAR || DOR || align=right | 6.7 km || 
|-id=319 bgcolor=#d6d6d6
| 89319 ||  || — || November 9, 2001 || Socorro || LINEAR || EOS || align=right | 3.8 km || 
|-id=320 bgcolor=#fefefe
| 89320 ||  || — || November 9, 2001 || Socorro || LINEAR || EUT || align=right | 1.1 km || 
|-id=321 bgcolor=#fefefe
| 89321 ||  || — || November 9, 2001 || Socorro || LINEAR || — || align=right | 2.2 km || 
|-id=322 bgcolor=#fefefe
| 89322 ||  || — || November 9, 2001 || Socorro || LINEAR || NYS || align=right | 1.6 km || 
|-id=323 bgcolor=#E9E9E9
| 89323 ||  || — || November 9, 2001 || Socorro || LINEAR || — || align=right | 4.9 km || 
|-id=324 bgcolor=#fefefe
| 89324 ||  || — || November 9, 2001 || Socorro || LINEAR || NYS || align=right | 1.4 km || 
|-id=325 bgcolor=#fefefe
| 89325 ||  || — || November 9, 2001 || Socorro || LINEAR || NYS || align=right | 2.0 km || 
|-id=326 bgcolor=#fefefe
| 89326 ||  || — || November 9, 2001 || Socorro || LINEAR || V || align=right | 4.6 km || 
|-id=327 bgcolor=#fefefe
| 89327 ||  || — || November 9, 2001 || Socorro || LINEAR || V || align=right | 1.8 km || 
|-id=328 bgcolor=#E9E9E9
| 89328 ||  || — || November 9, 2001 || Socorro || LINEAR || EUN || align=right | 3.8 km || 
|-id=329 bgcolor=#fefefe
| 89329 ||  || — || November 9, 2001 || Socorro || LINEAR || — || align=right | 2.6 km || 
|-id=330 bgcolor=#fefefe
| 89330 ||  || — || November 9, 2001 || Socorro || LINEAR || FLO || align=right | 2.3 km || 
|-id=331 bgcolor=#fefefe
| 89331 ||  || — || November 9, 2001 || Socorro || LINEAR || FLO || align=right | 2.0 km || 
|-id=332 bgcolor=#E9E9E9
| 89332 ||  || — || November 9, 2001 || Socorro || LINEAR || — || align=right | 3.0 km || 
|-id=333 bgcolor=#d6d6d6
| 89333 ||  || — || November 10, 2001 || Socorro || LINEAR || — || align=right | 7.4 km || 
|-id=334 bgcolor=#E9E9E9
| 89334 ||  || — || November 10, 2001 || Socorro || LINEAR || — || align=right | 2.4 km || 
|-id=335 bgcolor=#fefefe
| 89335 ||  || — || November 10, 2001 || Socorro || LINEAR || — || align=right | 2.1 km || 
|-id=336 bgcolor=#E9E9E9
| 89336 ||  || — || November 10, 2001 || Socorro || LINEAR || — || align=right | 3.5 km || 
|-id=337 bgcolor=#E9E9E9
| 89337 ||  || — || November 10, 2001 || Socorro || LINEAR || GEF || align=right | 2.7 km || 
|-id=338 bgcolor=#E9E9E9
| 89338 ||  || — || November 10, 2001 || Socorro || LINEAR || — || align=right | 3.6 km || 
|-id=339 bgcolor=#E9E9E9
| 89339 ||  || — || November 10, 2001 || Socorro || LINEAR || — || align=right | 5.2 km || 
|-id=340 bgcolor=#d6d6d6
| 89340 ||  || — || November 10, 2001 || Socorro || LINEAR || — || align=right | 5.0 km || 
|-id=341 bgcolor=#E9E9E9
| 89341 ||  || — || November 10, 2001 || Socorro || LINEAR || MRX || align=right | 2.5 km || 
|-id=342 bgcolor=#fefefe
| 89342 ||  || — || November 10, 2001 || Socorro || LINEAR || — || align=right | 2.8 km || 
|-id=343 bgcolor=#E9E9E9
| 89343 ||  || — || November 10, 2001 || Socorro || LINEAR || — || align=right | 3.1 km || 
|-id=344 bgcolor=#fefefe
| 89344 ||  || — || November 10, 2001 || Socorro || LINEAR || V || align=right | 1.2 km || 
|-id=345 bgcolor=#fefefe
| 89345 ||  || — || November 10, 2001 || Socorro || LINEAR || FLO || align=right | 1.5 km || 
|-id=346 bgcolor=#fefefe
| 89346 ||  || — || November 10, 2001 || Socorro || LINEAR || — || align=right | 1.7 km || 
|-id=347 bgcolor=#E9E9E9
| 89347 ||  || — || November 10, 2001 || Socorro || LINEAR || — || align=right | 3.1 km || 
|-id=348 bgcolor=#E9E9E9
| 89348 ||  || — || November 10, 2001 || Socorro || LINEAR || — || align=right | 7.2 km || 
|-id=349 bgcolor=#d6d6d6
| 89349 ||  || — || November 11, 2001 || Socorro || LINEAR || — || align=right | 7.3 km || 
|-id=350 bgcolor=#fefefe
| 89350 ||  || — || November 11, 2001 || Ondřejov || P. Kušnirák, P. Pravec || — || align=right | 2.2 km || 
|-id=351 bgcolor=#fefefe
| 89351 ||  || — || November 8, 2001 || Palomar || NEAT || — || align=right | 2.6 km || 
|-id=352 bgcolor=#E9E9E9
| 89352 ||  || — || November 8, 2001 || Palomar || NEAT || DOR || align=right | 7.9 km || 
|-id=353 bgcolor=#E9E9E9
| 89353 ||  || — || November 14, 2001 || Kitt Peak || Spacewatch || — || align=right | 3.1 km || 
|-id=354 bgcolor=#E9E9E9
| 89354 ||  || — || November 14, 2001 || Bisei SG Center || BATTeRS || NEM || align=right | 6.0 km || 
|-id=355 bgcolor=#FFC2E0
| 89355 ||  || — || November 15, 2001 || Anderson Mesa || LONEOS || AMO +1km || align=right | 2.0 km || 
|-id=356 bgcolor=#E9E9E9
| 89356 ||  || — || November 9, 2001 || Palomar || NEAT || — || align=right | 4.5 km || 
|-id=357 bgcolor=#E9E9E9
| 89357 ||  || — || November 9, 2001 || Palomar || NEAT || — || align=right | 2.6 km || 
|-id=358 bgcolor=#fefefe
| 89358 ||  || — || November 9, 2001 || Palomar || NEAT || — || align=right | 2.3 km || 
|-id=359 bgcolor=#fefefe
| 89359 ||  || — || November 9, 2001 || Palomar || NEAT || — || align=right | 2.2 km || 
|-id=360 bgcolor=#E9E9E9
| 89360 ||  || — || November 10, 2001 || Palomar || NEAT || WIT || align=right | 2.2 km || 
|-id=361 bgcolor=#E9E9E9
| 89361 ||  || — || November 10, 2001 || Palomar || NEAT || MAR || align=right | 2.1 km || 
|-id=362 bgcolor=#fefefe
| 89362 ||  || — || November 10, 2001 || Palomar || NEAT || V || align=right | 1.5 km || 
|-id=363 bgcolor=#E9E9E9
| 89363 ||  || — || November 10, 2001 || Palomar || NEAT || MIT || align=right | 8.4 km || 
|-id=364 bgcolor=#E9E9E9
| 89364 ||  || — || November 13, 2001 || Haleakala || NEAT || — || align=right | 2.0 km || 
|-id=365 bgcolor=#FA8072
| 89365 ||  || — || November 12, 2001 || Socorro || LINEAR || — || align=right | 1.5 km || 
|-id=366 bgcolor=#fefefe
| 89366 ||  || — || November 10, 2001 || Socorro || LINEAR || V || align=right | 1.4 km || 
|-id=367 bgcolor=#d6d6d6
| 89367 ||  || — || November 12, 2001 || Socorro || LINEAR || — || align=right | 4.8 km || 
|-id=368 bgcolor=#d6d6d6
| 89368 ||  || — || November 12, 2001 || Socorro || LINEAR || — || align=right | 4.9 km || 
|-id=369 bgcolor=#E9E9E9
| 89369 ||  || — || November 12, 2001 || Socorro || LINEAR || — || align=right | 4.5 km || 
|-id=370 bgcolor=#E9E9E9
| 89370 ||  || — || November 13, 2001 || Socorro || LINEAR || — || align=right | 3.1 km || 
|-id=371 bgcolor=#d6d6d6
| 89371 ||  || — || November 15, 2001 || Socorro || LINEAR || — || align=right | 6.4 km || 
|-id=372 bgcolor=#E9E9E9
| 89372 ||  || — || November 15, 2001 || Socorro || LINEAR || HNS || align=right | 3.0 km || 
|-id=373 bgcolor=#d6d6d6
| 89373 ||  || — || November 14, 2001 || Kitt Peak || Spacewatch || — || align=right | 4.8 km || 
|-id=374 bgcolor=#E9E9E9
| 89374 ||  || — || November 15, 2001 || Socorro || LINEAR || MAR || align=right | 2.8 km || 
|-id=375 bgcolor=#d6d6d6
| 89375 ||  || — || November 15, 2001 || Socorro || LINEAR || — || align=right | 6.5 km || 
|-id=376 bgcolor=#E9E9E9
| 89376 ||  || — || November 15, 2001 || Socorro || LINEAR || — || align=right | 3.4 km || 
|-id=377 bgcolor=#E9E9E9
| 89377 ||  || — || November 15, 2001 || Socorro || LINEAR || MAR || align=right | 2.8 km || 
|-id=378 bgcolor=#d6d6d6
| 89378 ||  || — || November 15, 2001 || Socorro || LINEAR || — || align=right | 6.7 km || 
|-id=379 bgcolor=#E9E9E9
| 89379 ||  || — || November 15, 2001 || Socorro || LINEAR || ADE || align=right | 4.4 km || 
|-id=380 bgcolor=#E9E9E9
| 89380 ||  || — || November 15, 2001 || Socorro || LINEAR || — || align=right | 3.4 km || 
|-id=381 bgcolor=#E9E9E9
| 89381 ||  || — || November 15, 2001 || Socorro || LINEAR || — || align=right | 3.8 km || 
|-id=382 bgcolor=#E9E9E9
| 89382 ||  || — || November 15, 2001 || Socorro || LINEAR || — || align=right | 2.8 km || 
|-id=383 bgcolor=#E9E9E9
| 89383 ||  || — || November 15, 2001 || Socorro || LINEAR || HNS || align=right | 3.5 km || 
|-id=384 bgcolor=#fefefe
| 89384 ||  || — || November 12, 2001 || Socorro || LINEAR || V || align=right | 1.5 km || 
|-id=385 bgcolor=#d6d6d6
| 89385 ||  || — || November 12, 2001 || Socorro || LINEAR || — || align=right | 5.4 km || 
|-id=386 bgcolor=#E9E9E9
| 89386 ||  || — || November 12, 2001 || Socorro || LINEAR || — || align=right | 1.8 km || 
|-id=387 bgcolor=#E9E9E9
| 89387 ||  || — || November 12, 2001 || Socorro || LINEAR || — || align=right | 2.0 km || 
|-id=388 bgcolor=#fefefe
| 89388 ||  || — || November 12, 2001 || Socorro || LINEAR || — || align=right | 1.6 km || 
|-id=389 bgcolor=#d6d6d6
| 89389 ||  || — || November 12, 2001 || Socorro || LINEAR || — || align=right | 4.8 km || 
|-id=390 bgcolor=#d6d6d6
| 89390 ||  || — || November 12, 2001 || Socorro || LINEAR || KOR || align=right | 2.9 km || 
|-id=391 bgcolor=#fefefe
| 89391 ||  || — || November 12, 2001 || Socorro || LINEAR || V || align=right | 1.8 km || 
|-id=392 bgcolor=#E9E9E9
| 89392 ||  || — || November 12, 2001 || Socorro || LINEAR || — || align=right | 3.6 km || 
|-id=393 bgcolor=#E9E9E9
| 89393 ||  || — || November 12, 2001 || Socorro || LINEAR || HOF || align=right | 5.6 km || 
|-id=394 bgcolor=#E9E9E9
| 89394 ||  || — || November 12, 2001 || Socorro || LINEAR || — || align=right | 2.3 km || 
|-id=395 bgcolor=#E9E9E9
| 89395 ||  || — || November 12, 2001 || Socorro || LINEAR || — || align=right | 4.7 km || 
|-id=396 bgcolor=#E9E9E9
| 89396 ||  || — || November 12, 2001 || Socorro || LINEAR || — || align=right | 2.7 km || 
|-id=397 bgcolor=#fefefe
| 89397 ||  || — || November 12, 2001 || Socorro || LINEAR || — || align=right | 1.9 km || 
|-id=398 bgcolor=#d6d6d6
| 89398 ||  || — || November 12, 2001 || Socorro || LINEAR || — || align=right | 3.9 km || 
|-id=399 bgcolor=#fefefe
| 89399 ||  || — || November 12, 2001 || Socorro || LINEAR || FLO || align=right | 1.6 km || 
|-id=400 bgcolor=#fefefe
| 89400 || 2001 WB || — || November 16, 2001 || Oizumi || T. Kobayashi || NYS || align=right | 2.0 km || 
|}

89401–89500 

|-bgcolor=#d6d6d6
| 89401 ||  || — || November 17, 2001 || Kitt Peak || Spacewatch || THM || align=right | 3.9 km || 
|-id=402 bgcolor=#E9E9E9
| 89402 ||  || — || November 19, 2001 || Oizumi || T. Kobayashi || — || align=right | 5.1 km || 
|-id=403 bgcolor=#fefefe
| 89403 ||  || — || November 17, 2001 || Socorro || LINEAR || MAS || align=right | 1.3 km || 
|-id=404 bgcolor=#fefefe
| 89404 ||  || — || November 17, 2001 || Socorro || LINEAR || FLO || align=right | 1.3 km || 
|-id=405 bgcolor=#fefefe
| 89405 ||  || — || November 17, 2001 || Socorro || LINEAR || V || align=right | 2.1 km || 
|-id=406 bgcolor=#fefefe
| 89406 ||  || — || November 17, 2001 || Socorro || LINEAR || — || align=right | 1.6 km || 
|-id=407 bgcolor=#fefefe
| 89407 ||  || — || November 17, 2001 || Socorro || LINEAR || V || align=right | 1.3 km || 
|-id=408 bgcolor=#E9E9E9
| 89408 ||  || — || November 17, 2001 || Socorro || LINEAR || RAF || align=right | 2.0 km || 
|-id=409 bgcolor=#fefefe
| 89409 ||  || — || November 17, 2001 || Socorro || LINEAR || V || align=right | 1.1 km || 
|-id=410 bgcolor=#fefefe
| 89410 ||  || — || November 17, 2001 || Socorro || LINEAR || V || align=right | 1.7 km || 
|-id=411 bgcolor=#d6d6d6
| 89411 ||  || — || November 17, 2001 || Socorro || LINEAR || KOR || align=right | 2.6 km || 
|-id=412 bgcolor=#d6d6d6
| 89412 ||  || — || November 17, 2001 || Socorro || LINEAR || — || align=right | 3.5 km || 
|-id=413 bgcolor=#fefefe
| 89413 ||  || — || November 18, 2001 || Socorro || LINEAR || V || align=right | 1.8 km || 
|-id=414 bgcolor=#d6d6d6
| 89414 ||  || — || November 18, 2001 || Socorro || LINEAR || — || align=right | 6.3 km || 
|-id=415 bgcolor=#E9E9E9
| 89415 ||  || — || November 17, 2001 || Socorro || LINEAR || — || align=right | 2.1 km || 
|-id=416 bgcolor=#fefefe
| 89416 ||  || — || November 17, 2001 || Socorro || LINEAR || — || align=right | 1.2 km || 
|-id=417 bgcolor=#fefefe
| 89417 ||  || — || November 17, 2001 || Socorro || LINEAR || NYS || align=right | 1.5 km || 
|-id=418 bgcolor=#fefefe
| 89418 ||  || — || November 17, 2001 || Socorro || LINEAR || NYS || align=right | 3.3 km || 
|-id=419 bgcolor=#fefefe
| 89419 ||  || — || November 17, 2001 || Socorro || LINEAR || V || align=right | 1.7 km || 
|-id=420 bgcolor=#fefefe
| 89420 ||  || — || November 17, 2001 || Socorro || LINEAR || — || align=right | 1.9 km || 
|-id=421 bgcolor=#E9E9E9
| 89421 ||  || — || November 17, 2001 || Socorro || LINEAR || — || align=right | 3.6 km || 
|-id=422 bgcolor=#E9E9E9
| 89422 ||  || — || November 17, 2001 || Socorro || LINEAR || — || align=right | 4.3 km || 
|-id=423 bgcolor=#fefefe
| 89423 ||  || — || November 17, 2001 || Socorro || LINEAR || V || align=right | 1.2 km || 
|-id=424 bgcolor=#fefefe
| 89424 ||  || — || November 17, 2001 || Socorro || LINEAR || FLO || align=right | 1.2 km || 
|-id=425 bgcolor=#d6d6d6
| 89425 ||  || — || November 17, 2001 || Socorro || LINEAR || EOS || align=right | 4.1 km || 
|-id=426 bgcolor=#fefefe
| 89426 ||  || — || November 17, 2001 || Socorro || LINEAR || — || align=right | 1.3 km || 
|-id=427 bgcolor=#E9E9E9
| 89427 ||  || — || November 17, 2001 || Socorro || LINEAR || — || align=right | 5.4 km || 
|-id=428 bgcolor=#d6d6d6
| 89428 ||  || — || November 17, 2001 || Socorro || LINEAR || — || align=right | 7.7 km || 
|-id=429 bgcolor=#E9E9E9
| 89429 ||  || — || November 17, 2001 || Socorro || LINEAR || INO || align=right | 3.4 km || 
|-id=430 bgcolor=#E9E9E9
| 89430 ||  || — || November 17, 2001 || Socorro || LINEAR || — || align=right | 5.6 km || 
|-id=431 bgcolor=#fefefe
| 89431 ||  || — || November 17, 2001 || Socorro || LINEAR || FLO || align=right | 2.0 km || 
|-id=432 bgcolor=#fefefe
| 89432 ||  || — || November 17, 2001 || Socorro || LINEAR || V || align=right | 2.3 km || 
|-id=433 bgcolor=#E9E9E9
| 89433 ||  || — || November 17, 2001 || Socorro || LINEAR || — || align=right | 2.5 km || 
|-id=434 bgcolor=#fefefe
| 89434 ||  || — || November 17, 2001 || Socorro || LINEAR || — || align=right | 2.7 km || 
|-id=435 bgcolor=#E9E9E9
| 89435 ||  || — || November 19, 2001 || Socorro || LINEAR || — || align=right | 4.0 km || 
|-id=436 bgcolor=#d6d6d6
| 89436 ||  || — || November 19, 2001 || Socorro || LINEAR || — || align=right | 4.8 km || 
|-id=437 bgcolor=#E9E9E9
| 89437 ||  || — || November 19, 2001 || Socorro || LINEAR || — || align=right | 1.8 km || 
|-id=438 bgcolor=#E9E9E9
| 89438 ||  || — || November 19, 2001 || Anderson Mesa || LONEOS || — || align=right | 6.6 km || 
|-id=439 bgcolor=#E9E9E9
| 89439 ||  || — || November 19, 2001 || Anderson Mesa || LONEOS || AER || align=right | 2.9 km || 
|-id=440 bgcolor=#fefefe
| 89440 ||  || — || November 19, 2001 || Haleakala || NEAT || — || align=right | 1.8 km || 
|-id=441 bgcolor=#E9E9E9
| 89441 ||  || — || November 19, 2001 || Socorro || LINEAR || AGN || align=right | 2.1 km || 
|-id=442 bgcolor=#fefefe
| 89442 ||  || — || November 19, 2001 || Socorro || LINEAR || — || align=right | 1.9 km || 
|-id=443 bgcolor=#d6d6d6
| 89443 ||  || — || November 19, 2001 || Socorro || LINEAR || — || align=right | 4.8 km || 
|-id=444 bgcolor=#E9E9E9
| 89444 ||  || — || November 19, 2001 || Socorro || LINEAR || GEF || align=right | 1.9 km || 
|-id=445 bgcolor=#fefefe
| 89445 ||  || — || November 20, 2001 || Socorro || LINEAR || — || align=right | 1.7 km || 
|-id=446 bgcolor=#d6d6d6
| 89446 ||  || — || November 20, 2001 || Socorro || LINEAR || KOR || align=right | 2.2 km || 
|-id=447 bgcolor=#fefefe
| 89447 ||  || — || November 20, 2001 || Socorro || LINEAR || — || align=right | 1.8 km || 
|-id=448 bgcolor=#E9E9E9
| 89448 ||  || — || November 21, 2001 || Socorro || LINEAR || — || align=right | 3.6 km || 
|-id=449 bgcolor=#d6d6d6
| 89449 ||  || — || November 21, 2001 || Haleakala || NEAT || ARM || align=right | 7.3 km || 
|-id=450 bgcolor=#d6d6d6
| 89450 ||  || — || November 19, 2001 || Anderson Mesa || LONEOS || CHA || align=right | 3.9 km || 
|-id=451 bgcolor=#d6d6d6
| 89451 ||  || — || November 17, 2001 || Socorro || LINEAR || — || align=right | 6.5 km || 
|-id=452 bgcolor=#fefefe
| 89452 ||  || — || November 17, 2001 || Socorro || LINEAR || V || align=right | 1.1 km || 
|-id=453 bgcolor=#d6d6d6
| 89453 ||  || — || November 19, 2001 || Anderson Mesa || LONEOS || EOS || align=right | 2.8 km || 
|-id=454 bgcolor=#FA8072
| 89454 || 2001 XG || — || December 4, 2001 || Socorro || LINEAR || — || align=right | 2.6 km || 
|-id=455 bgcolor=#fefefe
| 89455 Metzendorf ||  ||  || December 8, 2001 || Starkenburg Observatory || Starkenburg Obs. || V || align=right | 1.5 km || 
|-id=456 bgcolor=#fefefe
| 89456 ||  || — || December 5, 2001 || Haleakala || NEAT || — || align=right | 1.8 km || 
|-id=457 bgcolor=#d6d6d6
| 89457 ||  || — || December 5, 2001 || Haleakala || NEAT || — || align=right | 5.4 km || 
|-id=458 bgcolor=#E9E9E9
| 89458 ||  || — || December 7, 2001 || Socorro || LINEAR || EUN || align=right | 2.5 km || 
|-id=459 bgcolor=#E9E9E9
| 89459 ||  || — || December 7, 2001 || Socorro || LINEAR || EUN || align=right | 2.8 km || 
|-id=460 bgcolor=#d6d6d6
| 89460 ||  || — || December 8, 2001 || Socorro || LINEAR || URS || align=right | 7.7 km || 
|-id=461 bgcolor=#E9E9E9
| 89461 ||  || — || December 9, 2001 || Socorro || LINEAR || EUN || align=right | 3.6 km || 
|-id=462 bgcolor=#E9E9E9
| 89462 ||  || — || December 7, 2001 || Socorro || LINEAR || AGN || align=right | 2.6 km || 
|-id=463 bgcolor=#fefefe
| 89463 ||  || — || December 9, 2001 || Socorro || LINEAR || — || align=right | 2.3 km || 
|-id=464 bgcolor=#E9E9E9
| 89464 ||  || — || December 9, 2001 || Socorro || LINEAR || JUN || align=right | 5.1 km || 
|-id=465 bgcolor=#d6d6d6
| 89465 ||  || — || December 10, 2001 || Socorro || LINEAR || ALA || align=right | 9.3 km || 
|-id=466 bgcolor=#fefefe
| 89466 ||  || — || December 9, 2001 || Socorro || LINEAR || FLO || align=right | 2.0 km || 
|-id=467 bgcolor=#fefefe
| 89467 ||  || — || December 9, 2001 || Socorro || LINEAR || FLO || align=right | 1.8 km || 
|-id=468 bgcolor=#E9E9E9
| 89468 ||  || — || December 9, 2001 || Socorro || LINEAR || — || align=right | 3.4 km || 
|-id=469 bgcolor=#E9E9E9
| 89469 ||  || — || December 9, 2001 || Socorro || LINEAR || — || align=right | 2.4 km || 
|-id=470 bgcolor=#fefefe
| 89470 ||  || — || December 9, 2001 || Socorro || LINEAR || V || align=right | 1.9 km || 
|-id=471 bgcolor=#fefefe
| 89471 ||  || — || December 9, 2001 || Socorro || LINEAR || — || align=right | 2.4 km || 
|-id=472 bgcolor=#E9E9E9
| 89472 ||  || — || December 9, 2001 || Socorro || LINEAR || — || align=right | 2.1 km || 
|-id=473 bgcolor=#E9E9E9
| 89473 ||  || — || December 9, 2001 || Socorro || LINEAR || — || align=right | 2.0 km || 
|-id=474 bgcolor=#d6d6d6
| 89474 ||  || — || December 9, 2001 || Socorro || LINEAR || — || align=right | 2.4 km || 
|-id=475 bgcolor=#fefefe
| 89475 ||  || — || December 10, 2001 || Socorro || LINEAR || FLO || align=right | 2.6 km || 
|-id=476 bgcolor=#fefefe
| 89476 ||  || — || December 10, 2001 || Socorro || LINEAR || — || align=right | 4.0 km || 
|-id=477 bgcolor=#fefefe
| 89477 ||  || — || December 10, 2001 || Socorro || LINEAR || PHO || align=right | 2.6 km || 
|-id=478 bgcolor=#fefefe
| 89478 ||  || — || December 10, 2001 || Socorro || LINEAR || V || align=right | 1.7 km || 
|-id=479 bgcolor=#E9E9E9
| 89479 ||  || — || December 10, 2001 || Socorro || LINEAR || — || align=right | 3.1 km || 
|-id=480 bgcolor=#fefefe
| 89480 ||  || — || December 10, 2001 || Socorro || LINEAR || FLO || align=right | 2.6 km || 
|-id=481 bgcolor=#fefefe
| 89481 ||  || — || December 10, 2001 || Socorro || LINEAR || — || align=right | 2.2 km || 
|-id=482 bgcolor=#E9E9E9
| 89482 ||  || — || December 11, 2001 || Socorro || LINEAR || — || align=right | 2.7 km || 
|-id=483 bgcolor=#fefefe
| 89483 ||  || — || December 11, 2001 || Socorro || LINEAR || V || align=right | 1.9 km || 
|-id=484 bgcolor=#fefefe
| 89484 ||  || — || December 11, 2001 || Socorro || LINEAR || NYS || align=right | 2.0 km || 
|-id=485 bgcolor=#fefefe
| 89485 ||  || — || December 11, 2001 || Socorro || LINEAR || — || align=right | 2.0 km || 
|-id=486 bgcolor=#FA8072
| 89486 ||  || — || December 11, 2001 || Socorro || LINEAR || — || align=right | 2.2 km || 
|-id=487 bgcolor=#fefefe
| 89487 ||  || — || December 14, 2001 || Oizumi || T. Kobayashi || FLO || align=right | 2.0 km || 
|-id=488 bgcolor=#d6d6d6
| 89488 ||  || — || December 10, 2001 || Kitt Peak || Spacewatch || EOS || align=right | 3.5 km || 
|-id=489 bgcolor=#fefefe
| 89489 ||  || — || December 7, 2001 || Socorro || LINEAR || — || align=right | 1.4 km || 
|-id=490 bgcolor=#fefefe
| 89490 ||  || — || December 9, 2001 || Socorro || LINEAR || — || align=right | 1.7 km || 
|-id=491 bgcolor=#E9E9E9
| 89491 ||  || — || December 9, 2001 || Socorro || LINEAR || — || align=right | 4.2 km || 
|-id=492 bgcolor=#E9E9E9
| 89492 ||  || — || December 9, 2001 || Socorro || LINEAR || — || align=right | 4.3 km || 
|-id=493 bgcolor=#fefefe
| 89493 ||  || — || December 9, 2001 || Socorro || LINEAR || V || align=right | 1.7 km || 
|-id=494 bgcolor=#E9E9E9
| 89494 ||  || — || December 9, 2001 || Socorro || LINEAR || — || align=right | 7.3 km || 
|-id=495 bgcolor=#E9E9E9
| 89495 ||  || — || December 9, 2001 || Socorro || LINEAR || — || align=right | 3.5 km || 
|-id=496 bgcolor=#E9E9E9
| 89496 ||  || — || December 9, 2001 || Socorro || LINEAR || GEF || align=right | 5.0 km || 
|-id=497 bgcolor=#E9E9E9
| 89497 ||  || — || December 9, 2001 || Socorro || LINEAR || AER || align=right | 3.0 km || 
|-id=498 bgcolor=#d6d6d6
| 89498 ||  || — || December 9, 2001 || Socorro || LINEAR || EUP || align=right | 9.2 km || 
|-id=499 bgcolor=#fefefe
| 89499 ||  || — || December 9, 2001 || Socorro || LINEAR || — || align=right | 2.6 km || 
|-id=500 bgcolor=#d6d6d6
| 89500 ||  || — || December 10, 2001 || Socorro || LINEAR || — || align=right | 8.0 km || 
|}

89501–89600 

|-bgcolor=#E9E9E9
| 89501 ||  || — || December 10, 2001 || Socorro || LINEAR || HNS || align=right | 3.1 km || 
|-id=502 bgcolor=#E9E9E9
| 89502 ||  || — || December 14, 2001 || Socorro || LINEAR || — || align=right | 1.9 km || 
|-id=503 bgcolor=#d6d6d6
| 89503 ||  || — || December 10, 2001 || Socorro || LINEAR || EOS || align=right | 3.7 km || 
|-id=504 bgcolor=#d6d6d6
| 89504 ||  || — || December 10, 2001 || Socorro || LINEAR || — || align=right | 5.3 km || 
|-id=505 bgcolor=#d6d6d6
| 89505 ||  || — || December 10, 2001 || Socorro || LINEAR || — || align=right | 3.5 km || 
|-id=506 bgcolor=#E9E9E9
| 89506 ||  || — || December 10, 2001 || Socorro || LINEAR || GEF || align=right | 2.6 km || 
|-id=507 bgcolor=#fefefe
| 89507 ||  || — || December 10, 2001 || Socorro || LINEAR || NYS || align=right | 1.5 km || 
|-id=508 bgcolor=#d6d6d6
| 89508 ||  || — || December 11, 2001 || Socorro || LINEAR || — || align=right | 8.1 km || 
|-id=509 bgcolor=#fefefe
| 89509 ||  || — || December 10, 2001 || Socorro || LINEAR || MAS || align=right | 1.2 km || 
|-id=510 bgcolor=#fefefe
| 89510 ||  || — || December 11, 2001 || Socorro || LINEAR || — || align=right | 2.1 km || 
|-id=511 bgcolor=#fefefe
| 89511 ||  || — || December 10, 2001 || Socorro || LINEAR || — || align=right | 4.0 km || 
|-id=512 bgcolor=#fefefe
| 89512 ||  || — || December 10, 2001 || Socorro || LINEAR || MAS || align=right | 1.5 km || 
|-id=513 bgcolor=#fefefe
| 89513 ||  || — || December 10, 2001 || Socorro || LINEAR || NYS || align=right | 1.7 km || 
|-id=514 bgcolor=#fefefe
| 89514 ||  || — || December 10, 2001 || Socorro || LINEAR || NYS || align=right | 1.9 km || 
|-id=515 bgcolor=#fefefe
| 89515 ||  || — || December 10, 2001 || Socorro || LINEAR || V || align=right | 2.4 km || 
|-id=516 bgcolor=#E9E9E9
| 89516 ||  || — || December 10, 2001 || Socorro || LINEAR || — || align=right | 3.3 km || 
|-id=517 bgcolor=#fefefe
| 89517 ||  || — || December 10, 2001 || Socorro || LINEAR || NYS || align=right | 1.5 km || 
|-id=518 bgcolor=#fefefe
| 89518 ||  || — || December 10, 2001 || Socorro || LINEAR || NYS || align=right | 1.6 km || 
|-id=519 bgcolor=#fefefe
| 89519 ||  || — || December 10, 2001 || Socorro || LINEAR || NYS || align=right | 2.1 km || 
|-id=520 bgcolor=#E9E9E9
| 89520 ||  || — || December 10, 2001 || Socorro || LINEAR || — || align=right | 3.0 km || 
|-id=521 bgcolor=#E9E9E9
| 89521 ||  || — || December 10, 2001 || Socorro || LINEAR || — || align=right | 2.0 km || 
|-id=522 bgcolor=#fefefe
| 89522 ||  || — || December 10, 2001 || Socorro || LINEAR || — || align=right | 1.8 km || 
|-id=523 bgcolor=#E9E9E9
| 89523 ||  || — || December 10, 2001 || Socorro || LINEAR || — || align=right | 2.8 km || 
|-id=524 bgcolor=#fefefe
| 89524 ||  || — || December 10, 2001 || Socorro || LINEAR || — || align=right | 2.3 km || 
|-id=525 bgcolor=#fefefe
| 89525 ||  || — || December 10, 2001 || Socorro || LINEAR || — || align=right | 3.7 km || 
|-id=526 bgcolor=#E9E9E9
| 89526 ||  || — || December 11, 2001 || Socorro || LINEAR || MRX || align=right | 3.1 km || 
|-id=527 bgcolor=#E9E9E9
| 89527 ||  || — || December 11, 2001 || Socorro || LINEAR || — || align=right | 3.9 km || 
|-id=528 bgcolor=#d6d6d6
| 89528 ||  || — || December 11, 2001 || Socorro || LINEAR || — || align=right | 5.2 km || 
|-id=529 bgcolor=#fefefe
| 89529 ||  || — || December 11, 2001 || Socorro || LINEAR || FLO || align=right | 1.7 km || 
|-id=530 bgcolor=#E9E9E9
| 89530 ||  || — || December 11, 2001 || Socorro || LINEAR || — || align=right | 4.7 km || 
|-id=531 bgcolor=#d6d6d6
| 89531 ||  || — || December 11, 2001 || Socorro || LINEAR || — || align=right | 5.6 km || 
|-id=532 bgcolor=#E9E9E9
| 89532 ||  || — || December 11, 2001 || Socorro || LINEAR || — || align=right | 1.7 km || 
|-id=533 bgcolor=#fefefe
| 89533 ||  || — || December 11, 2001 || Socorro || LINEAR || NYS || align=right | 3.4 km || 
|-id=534 bgcolor=#fefefe
| 89534 ||  || — || December 11, 2001 || Socorro || LINEAR || — || align=right | 2.0 km || 
|-id=535 bgcolor=#fefefe
| 89535 ||  || — || December 11, 2001 || Socorro || LINEAR || — || align=right | 4.0 km || 
|-id=536 bgcolor=#E9E9E9
| 89536 ||  || — || December 11, 2001 || Socorro || LINEAR || — || align=right | 2.3 km || 
|-id=537 bgcolor=#E9E9E9
| 89537 ||  || — || December 11, 2001 || Socorro || LINEAR || — || align=right | 6.2 km || 
|-id=538 bgcolor=#fefefe
| 89538 ||  || — || December 11, 2001 || Socorro || LINEAR || NYS || align=right | 2.2 km || 
|-id=539 bgcolor=#fefefe
| 89539 ||  || — || December 11, 2001 || Socorro || LINEAR || NYS || align=right | 2.1 km || 
|-id=540 bgcolor=#E9E9E9
| 89540 ||  || — || December 11, 2001 || Socorro || LINEAR || — || align=right | 2.0 km || 
|-id=541 bgcolor=#fefefe
| 89541 ||  || — || December 13, 2001 || Socorro || LINEAR || V || align=right | 1.7 km || 
|-id=542 bgcolor=#E9E9E9
| 89542 ||  || — || December 10, 2001 || Socorro || LINEAR || MIT || align=right | 4.3 km || 
|-id=543 bgcolor=#E9E9E9
| 89543 ||  || — || December 10, 2001 || Socorro || LINEAR || — || align=right | 3.9 km || 
|-id=544 bgcolor=#fefefe
| 89544 ||  || — || December 10, 2001 || Socorro || LINEAR || — || align=right | 1.3 km || 
|-id=545 bgcolor=#E9E9E9
| 89545 ||  || — || December 10, 2001 || Socorro || LINEAR || — || align=right | 3.1 km || 
|-id=546 bgcolor=#d6d6d6
| 89546 ||  || — || December 10, 2001 || Socorro || LINEAR || KAR || align=right | 2.4 km || 
|-id=547 bgcolor=#fefefe
| 89547 ||  || — || December 10, 2001 || Socorro || LINEAR || — || align=right | 3.9 km || 
|-id=548 bgcolor=#E9E9E9
| 89548 ||  || — || December 10, 2001 || Socorro || LINEAR || — || align=right | 2.0 km || 
|-id=549 bgcolor=#E9E9E9
| 89549 ||  || — || December 10, 2001 || Socorro || LINEAR || — || align=right | 3.8 km || 
|-id=550 bgcolor=#E9E9E9
| 89550 ||  || — || December 10, 2001 || Socorro || LINEAR || EUN || align=right | 3.5 km || 
|-id=551 bgcolor=#fefefe
| 89551 ||  || — || December 10, 2001 || Socorro || LINEAR || NYS || align=right | 2.4 km || 
|-id=552 bgcolor=#fefefe
| 89552 ||  || — || December 10, 2001 || Socorro || LINEAR || EUT || align=right | 1.8 km || 
|-id=553 bgcolor=#fefefe
| 89553 ||  || — || December 10, 2001 || Socorro || LINEAR || NYS || align=right | 1.6 km || 
|-id=554 bgcolor=#E9E9E9
| 89554 ||  || — || December 10, 2001 || Socorro || LINEAR || — || align=right | 2.5 km || 
|-id=555 bgcolor=#fefefe
| 89555 ||  || — || December 10, 2001 || Socorro || LINEAR || — || align=right | 2.3 km || 
|-id=556 bgcolor=#fefefe
| 89556 ||  || — || December 10, 2001 || Socorro || LINEAR || NYS || align=right | 1.6 km || 
|-id=557 bgcolor=#fefefe
| 89557 ||  || — || December 10, 2001 || Socorro || LINEAR || — || align=right | 2.3 km || 
|-id=558 bgcolor=#E9E9E9
| 89558 ||  || — || December 10, 2001 || Socorro || LINEAR || — || align=right | 3.9 km || 
|-id=559 bgcolor=#E9E9E9
| 89559 ||  || — || December 10, 2001 || Socorro || LINEAR || — || align=right | 2.5 km || 
|-id=560 bgcolor=#fefefe
| 89560 ||  || — || December 10, 2001 || Socorro || LINEAR || — || align=right | 2.6 km || 
|-id=561 bgcolor=#fefefe
| 89561 ||  || — || December 10, 2001 || Socorro || LINEAR || — || align=right | 2.0 km || 
|-id=562 bgcolor=#d6d6d6
| 89562 ||  || — || December 10, 2001 || Socorro || LINEAR || EUP || align=right | 10 km || 
|-id=563 bgcolor=#fefefe
| 89563 ||  || — || December 10, 2001 || Socorro || LINEAR || — || align=right | 2.3 km || 
|-id=564 bgcolor=#fefefe
| 89564 ||  || — || December 14, 2001 || Socorro || LINEAR || — || align=right | 1.7 km || 
|-id=565 bgcolor=#E9E9E9
| 89565 ||  || — || December 14, 2001 || Kitt Peak || Spacewatch || — || align=right | 2.7 km || 
|-id=566 bgcolor=#FA8072
| 89566 ||  || — || December 10, 2001 || Socorro || LINEAR || — || align=right | 2.2 km || 
|-id=567 bgcolor=#fefefe
| 89567 ||  || — || December 11, 2001 || Socorro || LINEAR || V || align=right | 1.6 km || 
|-id=568 bgcolor=#fefefe
| 89568 ||  || — || December 13, 2001 || Socorro || LINEAR || — || align=right | 5.5 km || 
|-id=569 bgcolor=#fefefe
| 89569 ||  || — || December 13, 2001 || Socorro || LINEAR || — || align=right | 2.2 km || 
|-id=570 bgcolor=#fefefe
| 89570 ||  || — || December 13, 2001 || Socorro || LINEAR || — || align=right | 2.4 km || 
|-id=571 bgcolor=#fefefe
| 89571 ||  || — || December 13, 2001 || Socorro || LINEAR || — || align=right | 2.0 km || 
|-id=572 bgcolor=#E9E9E9
| 89572 ||  || — || December 13, 2001 || Socorro || LINEAR || RAF || align=right | 2.6 km || 
|-id=573 bgcolor=#fefefe
| 89573 ||  || — || December 13, 2001 || Socorro || LINEAR || — || align=right | 2.2 km || 
|-id=574 bgcolor=#E9E9E9
| 89574 ||  || — || December 13, 2001 || Socorro || LINEAR || — || align=right | 3.4 km || 
|-id=575 bgcolor=#E9E9E9
| 89575 ||  || — || December 13, 2001 || Socorro || LINEAR || EUN || align=right | 3.0 km || 
|-id=576 bgcolor=#E9E9E9
| 89576 ||  || — || December 13, 2001 || Socorro || LINEAR || — || align=right | 5.1 km || 
|-id=577 bgcolor=#fefefe
| 89577 ||  || — || December 14, 2001 || Socorro || LINEAR || ERI || align=right | 4.6 km || 
|-id=578 bgcolor=#d6d6d6
| 89578 ||  || — || December 14, 2001 || Socorro || LINEAR || — || align=right | 4.0 km || 
|-id=579 bgcolor=#E9E9E9
| 89579 ||  || — || December 14, 2001 || Socorro || LINEAR || — || align=right | 4.1 km || 
|-id=580 bgcolor=#d6d6d6
| 89580 ||  || — || December 14, 2001 || Socorro || LINEAR || — || align=right | 3.9 km || 
|-id=581 bgcolor=#fefefe
| 89581 ||  || — || December 14, 2001 || Socorro || LINEAR || — || align=right | 1.7 km || 
|-id=582 bgcolor=#E9E9E9
| 89582 ||  || — || December 14, 2001 || Socorro || LINEAR || — || align=right | 3.1 km || 
|-id=583 bgcolor=#d6d6d6
| 89583 ||  || — || December 14, 2001 || Socorro || LINEAR || — || align=right | 4.9 km || 
|-id=584 bgcolor=#fefefe
| 89584 ||  || — || December 14, 2001 || Socorro || LINEAR || NYS || align=right | 1.6 km || 
|-id=585 bgcolor=#fefefe
| 89585 ||  || — || December 14, 2001 || Socorro || LINEAR || NYS || align=right | 1.2 km || 
|-id=586 bgcolor=#fefefe
| 89586 ||  || — || December 14, 2001 || Socorro || LINEAR || — || align=right | 1.9 km || 
|-id=587 bgcolor=#E9E9E9
| 89587 ||  || — || December 14, 2001 || Socorro || LINEAR || — || align=right | 3.3 km || 
|-id=588 bgcolor=#fefefe
| 89588 ||  || — || December 14, 2001 || Socorro || LINEAR || V || align=right | 1.6 km || 
|-id=589 bgcolor=#d6d6d6
| 89589 ||  || — || December 14, 2001 || Socorro || LINEAR || KOR || align=right | 2.8 km || 
|-id=590 bgcolor=#d6d6d6
| 89590 ||  || — || December 14, 2001 || Socorro || LINEAR || — || align=right | 3.2 km || 
|-id=591 bgcolor=#fefefe
| 89591 ||  || — || December 14, 2001 || Socorro || LINEAR || — || align=right | 1.4 km || 
|-id=592 bgcolor=#fefefe
| 89592 ||  || — || December 14, 2001 || Socorro || LINEAR || NYS || align=right | 3.3 km || 
|-id=593 bgcolor=#d6d6d6
| 89593 ||  || — || December 14, 2001 || Socorro || LINEAR || — || align=right | 5.7 km || 
|-id=594 bgcolor=#fefefe
| 89594 ||  || — || December 14, 2001 || Socorro || LINEAR || — || align=right | 1.7 km || 
|-id=595 bgcolor=#d6d6d6
| 89595 ||  || — || December 14, 2001 || Socorro || LINEAR || — || align=right | 7.4 km || 
|-id=596 bgcolor=#fefefe
| 89596 ||  || — || December 14, 2001 || Socorro || LINEAR || NYS || align=right | 1.2 km || 
|-id=597 bgcolor=#fefefe
| 89597 ||  || — || December 14, 2001 || Socorro || LINEAR || V || align=right | 1.7 km || 
|-id=598 bgcolor=#fefefe
| 89598 ||  || — || December 14, 2001 || Socorro || LINEAR || MAS || align=right | 1.4 km || 
|-id=599 bgcolor=#fefefe
| 89599 ||  || — || December 14, 2001 || Socorro || LINEAR || NYS || align=right | 1.0 km || 
|-id=600 bgcolor=#fefefe
| 89600 ||  || — || December 14, 2001 || Socorro || LINEAR || NYS || align=right | 2.8 km || 
|}

89601–89700 

|-bgcolor=#fefefe
| 89601 ||  || — || December 14, 2001 || Socorro || LINEAR || ERI || align=right | 3.5 km || 
|-id=602 bgcolor=#E9E9E9
| 89602 ||  || — || December 14, 2001 || Socorro || LINEAR || HEN || align=right | 2.3 km || 
|-id=603 bgcolor=#fefefe
| 89603 ||  || — || December 14, 2001 || Socorro || LINEAR || — || align=right | 2.1 km || 
|-id=604 bgcolor=#fefefe
| 89604 ||  || — || December 14, 2001 || Socorro || LINEAR || NYS || align=right | 2.9 km || 
|-id=605 bgcolor=#d6d6d6
| 89605 ||  || — || December 14, 2001 || Socorro || LINEAR || TIR || align=right | 4.0 km || 
|-id=606 bgcolor=#fefefe
| 89606 ||  || — || December 14, 2001 || Socorro || LINEAR || NYS || align=right | 1.5 km || 
|-id=607 bgcolor=#fefefe
| 89607 ||  || — || December 14, 2001 || Socorro || LINEAR || NYS || align=right | 3.6 km || 
|-id=608 bgcolor=#fefefe
| 89608 ||  || — || December 14, 2001 || Socorro || LINEAR || NYS || align=right | 1.7 km || 
|-id=609 bgcolor=#fefefe
| 89609 ||  || — || December 14, 2001 || Socorro || LINEAR || V || align=right | 1.2 km || 
|-id=610 bgcolor=#E9E9E9
| 89610 ||  || — || December 14, 2001 || Socorro || LINEAR || — || align=right | 3.2 km || 
|-id=611 bgcolor=#fefefe
| 89611 ||  || — || December 14, 2001 || Socorro || LINEAR || MAS || align=right | 1.8 km || 
|-id=612 bgcolor=#fefefe
| 89612 ||  || — || December 14, 2001 || Socorro || LINEAR || V || align=right | 1.7 km || 
|-id=613 bgcolor=#fefefe
| 89613 ||  || — || December 14, 2001 || Socorro || LINEAR || NYS || align=right | 1.3 km || 
|-id=614 bgcolor=#fefefe
| 89614 ||  || — || December 14, 2001 || Socorro || LINEAR || — || align=right | 2.0 km || 
|-id=615 bgcolor=#E9E9E9
| 89615 ||  || — || December 14, 2001 || Socorro || LINEAR || — || align=right | 2.0 km || 
|-id=616 bgcolor=#fefefe
| 89616 ||  || — || December 14, 2001 || Socorro || LINEAR || NYS || align=right | 1.4 km || 
|-id=617 bgcolor=#E9E9E9
| 89617 ||  || — || December 14, 2001 || Socorro || LINEAR || — || align=right | 2.5 km || 
|-id=618 bgcolor=#fefefe
| 89618 ||  || — || December 14, 2001 || Socorro || LINEAR || NYS || align=right | 1.4 km || 
|-id=619 bgcolor=#fefefe
| 89619 ||  || — || December 14, 2001 || Socorro || LINEAR || — || align=right | 1.5 km || 
|-id=620 bgcolor=#fefefe
| 89620 ||  || — || December 14, 2001 || Socorro || LINEAR || — || align=right | 2.0 km || 
|-id=621 bgcolor=#d6d6d6
| 89621 ||  || — || December 14, 2001 || Socorro || LINEAR || — || align=right | 7.4 km || 
|-id=622 bgcolor=#fefefe
| 89622 ||  || — || December 14, 2001 || Socorro || LINEAR || EUT || align=right | 1.5 km || 
|-id=623 bgcolor=#d6d6d6
| 89623 ||  || — || December 14, 2001 || Socorro || LINEAR || — || align=right | 7.8 km || 
|-id=624 bgcolor=#d6d6d6
| 89624 ||  || — || December 14, 2001 || Socorro || LINEAR || ALA || align=right | 7.9 km || 
|-id=625 bgcolor=#fefefe
| 89625 ||  || — || December 14, 2001 || Socorro || LINEAR || NYS || align=right | 2.0 km || 
|-id=626 bgcolor=#d6d6d6
| 89626 ||  || — || December 14, 2001 || Socorro || LINEAR || — || align=right | 7.8 km || 
|-id=627 bgcolor=#fefefe
| 89627 ||  || — || December 15, 2001 || Socorro || LINEAR || NYS || align=right | 3.1 km || 
|-id=628 bgcolor=#fefefe
| 89628 ||  || — || December 11, 2001 || Socorro || LINEAR || NYS || align=right | 4.1 km || 
|-id=629 bgcolor=#fefefe
| 89629 ||  || — || December 11, 2001 || Socorro || LINEAR || V || align=right | 1.4 km || 
|-id=630 bgcolor=#fefefe
| 89630 ||  || — || December 11, 2001 || Socorro || LINEAR || — || align=right | 2.1 km || 
|-id=631 bgcolor=#d6d6d6
| 89631 ||  || — || December 11, 2001 || Socorro || LINEAR || — || align=right | 4.7 km || 
|-id=632 bgcolor=#fefefe
| 89632 ||  || — || December 11, 2001 || Socorro || LINEAR || — || align=right | 2.6 km || 
|-id=633 bgcolor=#E9E9E9
| 89633 ||  || — || December 11, 2001 || Socorro || LINEAR || slow || align=right | 2.0 km || 
|-id=634 bgcolor=#fefefe
| 89634 ||  || — || December 11, 2001 || Socorro || LINEAR || — || align=right | 2.1 km || 
|-id=635 bgcolor=#E9E9E9
| 89635 ||  || — || December 11, 2001 || Socorro || LINEAR || — || align=right | 2.8 km || 
|-id=636 bgcolor=#E9E9E9
| 89636 ||  || — || December 11, 2001 || Socorro || LINEAR || — || align=right | 2.5 km || 
|-id=637 bgcolor=#E9E9E9
| 89637 ||  || — || December 11, 2001 || Socorro || LINEAR || — || align=right | 3.8 km || 
|-id=638 bgcolor=#d6d6d6
| 89638 ||  || — || December 11, 2001 || Socorro || LINEAR || URS || align=right | 6.9 km || 
|-id=639 bgcolor=#fefefe
| 89639 ||  || — || December 15, 2001 || Socorro || LINEAR || MAS || align=right | 1.9 km || 
|-id=640 bgcolor=#fefefe
| 89640 ||  || — || December 15, 2001 || Socorro || LINEAR || — || align=right | 3.5 km || 
|-id=641 bgcolor=#fefefe
| 89641 ||  || — || December 15, 2001 || Socorro || LINEAR || — || align=right | 3.9 km || 
|-id=642 bgcolor=#fefefe
| 89642 ||  || — || December 15, 2001 || Socorro || LINEAR || V || align=right | 1.4 km || 
|-id=643 bgcolor=#fefefe
| 89643 ||  || — || December 15, 2001 || Socorro || LINEAR || FLO || align=right | 1.2 km || 
|-id=644 bgcolor=#fefefe
| 89644 ||  || — || December 15, 2001 || Socorro || LINEAR || — || align=right | 1.6 km || 
|-id=645 bgcolor=#d6d6d6
| 89645 ||  || — || December 15, 2001 || Socorro || LINEAR || HYG || align=right | 4.7 km || 
|-id=646 bgcolor=#E9E9E9
| 89646 ||  || — || December 15, 2001 || Socorro || LINEAR || — || align=right | 2.2 km || 
|-id=647 bgcolor=#E9E9E9
| 89647 ||  || — || December 15, 2001 || Socorro || LINEAR || NEM || align=right | 4.7 km || 
|-id=648 bgcolor=#E9E9E9
| 89648 ||  || — || December 15, 2001 || Socorro || LINEAR || — || align=right | 2.4 km || 
|-id=649 bgcolor=#fefefe
| 89649 ||  || — || December 15, 2001 || Socorro || LINEAR || — || align=right | 1.7 km || 
|-id=650 bgcolor=#d6d6d6
| 89650 ||  || — || December 14, 2001 || Socorro || LINEAR || — || align=right | 5.2 km || 
|-id=651 bgcolor=#d6d6d6
| 89651 ||  || — || December 15, 2001 || Socorro || LINEAR || THM || align=right | 5.1 km || 
|-id=652 bgcolor=#E9E9E9
| 89652 ||  || — || December 14, 2001 || Socorro || LINEAR || — || align=right | 2.6 km || 
|-id=653 bgcolor=#E9E9E9
| 89653 ||  || — || December 14, 2001 || Socorro || LINEAR || — || align=right | 3.1 km || 
|-id=654 bgcolor=#E9E9E9
| 89654 ||  || — || December 14, 2001 || Socorro || LINEAR || — || align=right | 4.7 km || 
|-id=655 bgcolor=#d6d6d6
| 89655 ||  || — || December 14, 2001 || Socorro || LINEAR || — || align=right | 5.7 km || 
|-id=656 bgcolor=#E9E9E9
| 89656 ||  || — || December 7, 2001 || Socorro || LINEAR || — || align=right | 3.5 km || 
|-id=657 bgcolor=#d6d6d6
| 89657 ||  || — || December 9, 2001 || Anderson Mesa || LONEOS || — || align=right | 6.5 km || 
|-id=658 bgcolor=#fefefe
| 89658 ||  || — || December 11, 2001 || Socorro || LINEAR || FLO || align=right | 1.1 km || 
|-id=659 bgcolor=#E9E9E9
| 89659 ||  || — || December 14, 2001 || Socorro || LINEAR || — || align=right | 4.1 km || 
|-id=660 bgcolor=#fefefe
| 89660 ||  || — || December 18, 2001 || Socorro || LINEAR || FLO || align=right | 2.0 km || 
|-id=661 bgcolor=#fefefe
| 89661 ||  || — || December 18, 2001 || Socorro || LINEAR || FLO || align=right | 1.7 km || 
|-id=662 bgcolor=#E9E9E9
| 89662 ||  || — || December 21, 2001 || Socorro || LINEAR || PAL || align=right | 6.2 km || 
|-id=663 bgcolor=#E9E9E9
| 89663 ||  || — || December 17, 2001 || Cima Ekar || ADAS || — || align=right | 3.4 km || 
|-id=664 bgcolor=#E9E9E9
| 89664 Pignata ||  ||  || December 19, 2001 || Cima Ekar || ADAS || — || align=right | 5.3 km || 
|-id=665 bgcolor=#E9E9E9
| 89665 ||  || — || December 20, 2001 || Cima Ekar || ADAS || GEF || align=right | 3.0 km || 
|-id=666 bgcolor=#d6d6d6
| 89666 ||  || — || December 17, 2001 || Socorro || LINEAR || — || align=right | 6.6 km || 
|-id=667 bgcolor=#E9E9E9
| 89667 ||  || — || December 17, 2001 || Socorro || LINEAR || GEF || align=right | 2.9 km || 
|-id=668 bgcolor=#E9E9E9
| 89668 ||  || — || December 17, 2001 || Socorro || LINEAR || — || align=right | 3.4 km || 
|-id=669 bgcolor=#fefefe
| 89669 ||  || — || December 17, 2001 || Socorro || LINEAR || — || align=right | 1.6 km || 
|-id=670 bgcolor=#E9E9E9
| 89670 ||  || — || December 17, 2001 || Socorro || LINEAR || EUN || align=right | 3.4 km || 
|-id=671 bgcolor=#E9E9E9
| 89671 ||  || — || December 18, 2001 || Socorro || LINEAR || — || align=right | 1.9 km || 
|-id=672 bgcolor=#d6d6d6
| 89672 ||  || — || December 18, 2001 || Socorro || LINEAR || EOS || align=right | 5.8 km || 
|-id=673 bgcolor=#E9E9E9
| 89673 ||  || — || December 18, 2001 || Socorro || LINEAR || — || align=right | 2.3 km || 
|-id=674 bgcolor=#E9E9E9
| 89674 ||  || — || December 18, 2001 || Socorro || LINEAR || — || align=right | 2.3 km || 
|-id=675 bgcolor=#fefefe
| 89675 ||  || — || December 18, 2001 || Socorro || LINEAR || NYS || align=right | 1.4 km || 
|-id=676 bgcolor=#fefefe
| 89676 ||  || — || December 18, 2001 || Socorro || LINEAR || FLO || align=right | 1.2 km || 
|-id=677 bgcolor=#fefefe
| 89677 ||  || — || December 18, 2001 || Socorro || LINEAR || NYS || align=right | 1.7 km || 
|-id=678 bgcolor=#fefefe
| 89678 ||  || — || December 18, 2001 || Socorro || LINEAR || V || align=right | 1.4 km || 
|-id=679 bgcolor=#d6d6d6
| 89679 ||  || — || December 18, 2001 || Socorro || LINEAR || — || align=right | 8.2 km || 
|-id=680 bgcolor=#fefefe
| 89680 ||  || — || December 18, 2001 || Socorro || LINEAR || — || align=right | 2.2 km || 
|-id=681 bgcolor=#E9E9E9
| 89681 ||  || — || December 18, 2001 || Socorro || LINEAR || HEN || align=right | 2.6 km || 
|-id=682 bgcolor=#fefefe
| 89682 ||  || — || December 18, 2001 || Socorro || LINEAR || NYS || align=right | 1.5 km || 
|-id=683 bgcolor=#fefefe
| 89683 ||  || — || December 18, 2001 || Socorro || LINEAR || NYS || align=right | 1.4 km || 
|-id=684 bgcolor=#E9E9E9
| 89684 ||  || — || December 18, 2001 || Socorro || LINEAR || — || align=right | 3.3 km || 
|-id=685 bgcolor=#E9E9E9
| 89685 ||  || — || December 18, 2001 || Socorro || LINEAR || — || align=right | 4.3 km || 
|-id=686 bgcolor=#fefefe
| 89686 ||  || — || December 18, 2001 || Socorro || LINEAR || — || align=right | 2.2 km || 
|-id=687 bgcolor=#d6d6d6
| 89687 ||  || — || December 18, 2001 || Socorro || LINEAR || — || align=right | 6.8 km || 
|-id=688 bgcolor=#d6d6d6
| 89688 ||  || — || December 18, 2001 || Socorro || LINEAR || — || align=right | 5.9 km || 
|-id=689 bgcolor=#fefefe
| 89689 ||  || — || December 18, 2001 || Socorro || LINEAR || NYS || align=right | 1.9 km || 
|-id=690 bgcolor=#d6d6d6
| 89690 ||  || — || December 18, 2001 || Socorro || LINEAR || — || align=right | 6.0 km || 
|-id=691 bgcolor=#fefefe
| 89691 ||  || — || December 18, 2001 || Socorro || LINEAR || FLO || align=right | 1.5 km || 
|-id=692 bgcolor=#fefefe
| 89692 ||  || — || December 18, 2001 || Socorro || LINEAR || — || align=right | 1.4 km || 
|-id=693 bgcolor=#fefefe
| 89693 ||  || — || December 18, 2001 || Socorro || LINEAR || — || align=right | 1.8 km || 
|-id=694 bgcolor=#E9E9E9
| 89694 ||  || — || December 18, 2001 || Socorro || LINEAR || RAF || align=right | 2.0 km || 
|-id=695 bgcolor=#fefefe
| 89695 ||  || — || December 18, 2001 || Socorro || LINEAR || NYS || align=right | 1.2 km || 
|-id=696 bgcolor=#fefefe
| 89696 ||  || — || December 18, 2001 || Socorro || LINEAR || — || align=right | 2.0 km || 
|-id=697 bgcolor=#fefefe
| 89697 ||  || — || December 18, 2001 || Socorro || LINEAR || NYS || align=right | 1.4 km || 
|-id=698 bgcolor=#d6d6d6
| 89698 ||  || — || December 18, 2001 || Socorro || LINEAR || — || align=right | 5.2 km || 
|-id=699 bgcolor=#fefefe
| 89699 ||  || — || December 18, 2001 || Socorro || LINEAR || — || align=right | 2.4 km || 
|-id=700 bgcolor=#fefefe
| 89700 ||  || — || December 18, 2001 || Socorro || LINEAR || EUT || align=right | 1.7 km || 
|}

89701–89800 

|-bgcolor=#E9E9E9
| 89701 ||  || — || December 18, 2001 || Socorro || LINEAR || PAD || align=right | 3.2 km || 
|-id=702 bgcolor=#E9E9E9
| 89702 ||  || — || December 18, 2001 || Socorro || LINEAR || — || align=right | 3.7 km || 
|-id=703 bgcolor=#fefefe
| 89703 ||  || — || December 18, 2001 || Socorro || LINEAR || — || align=right | 4.2 km || 
|-id=704 bgcolor=#fefefe
| 89704 ||  || — || December 18, 2001 || Socorro || LINEAR || — || align=right | 1.3 km || 
|-id=705 bgcolor=#E9E9E9
| 89705 ||  || — || December 16, 2001 || Anderson Mesa || LONEOS || MAR || align=right | 3.8 km || 
|-id=706 bgcolor=#E9E9E9
| 89706 ||  || — || December 17, 2001 || Socorro || LINEAR || GEF || align=right | 2.2 km || 
|-id=707 bgcolor=#fefefe
| 89707 ||  || — || December 17, 2001 || Socorro || LINEAR || — || align=right | 1.6 km || 
|-id=708 bgcolor=#E9E9E9
| 89708 ||  || — || December 17, 2001 || Socorro || LINEAR || — || align=right | 4.2 km || 
|-id=709 bgcolor=#fefefe
| 89709 ||  || — || December 17, 2001 || Socorro || LINEAR || — || align=right | 1.8 km || 
|-id=710 bgcolor=#E9E9E9
| 89710 ||  || — || December 17, 2001 || Socorro || LINEAR || — || align=right | 4.4 km || 
|-id=711 bgcolor=#E9E9E9
| 89711 ||  || — || December 18, 2001 || Socorro || LINEAR || EUN || align=right | 3.1 km || 
|-id=712 bgcolor=#fefefe
| 89712 ||  || — || December 18, 2001 || Anderson Mesa || LONEOS || — || align=right | 1.7 km || 
|-id=713 bgcolor=#E9E9E9
| 89713 ||  || — || December 17, 2001 || Anderson Mesa || LONEOS || HNS || align=right | 2.9 km || 
|-id=714 bgcolor=#d6d6d6
| 89714 ||  || — || December 19, 2001 || Socorro || LINEAR || EOS || align=right | 4.2 km || 
|-id=715 bgcolor=#E9E9E9
| 89715 ||  || — || December 17, 2001 || Socorro || LINEAR || — || align=right | 2.9 km || 
|-id=716 bgcolor=#E9E9E9
| 89716 ||  || — || December 17, 2001 || Socorro || LINEAR || — || align=right | 2.1 km || 
|-id=717 bgcolor=#d6d6d6
| 89717 ||  || — || December 17, 2001 || Socorro || LINEAR || — || align=right | 6.8 km || 
|-id=718 bgcolor=#fefefe
| 89718 ||  || — || December 17, 2001 || Socorro || LINEAR || V || align=right | 1.7 km || 
|-id=719 bgcolor=#E9E9E9
| 89719 ||  || — || December 17, 2001 || Socorro || LINEAR || ADE || align=right | 7.6 km || 
|-id=720 bgcolor=#fefefe
| 89720 ||  || — || December 17, 2001 || Socorro || LINEAR || — || align=right | 2.8 km || 
|-id=721 bgcolor=#E9E9E9
| 89721 ||  || — || December 17, 2001 || Socorro || LINEAR || — || align=right | 2.4 km || 
|-id=722 bgcolor=#d6d6d6
| 89722 ||  || — || December 17, 2001 || Socorro || LINEAR || — || align=right | 8.3 km || 
|-id=723 bgcolor=#fefefe
| 89723 ||  || — || December 17, 2001 || Socorro || LINEAR || FLO || align=right | 1.6 km || 
|-id=724 bgcolor=#fefefe
| 89724 ||  || — || December 17, 2001 || Socorro || LINEAR || — || align=right | 1.7 km || 
|-id=725 bgcolor=#E9E9E9
| 89725 ||  || — || December 19, 2001 || Socorro || LINEAR || — || align=right | 5.0 km || 
|-id=726 bgcolor=#E9E9E9
| 89726 ||  || — || December 17, 2001 || Socorro || LINEAR || — || align=right | 2.5 km || 
|-id=727 bgcolor=#d6d6d6
| 89727 ||  || — || December 19, 2001 || Socorro || LINEAR || — || align=right | 3.7 km || 
|-id=728 bgcolor=#E9E9E9
| 89728 ||  || — || December 22, 2001 || Socorro || LINEAR || — || align=right | 5.0 km || 
|-id=729 bgcolor=#fefefe
| 89729 ||  || — || December 22, 2001 || Socorro || LINEAR || — || align=right | 2.0 km || 
|-id=730 bgcolor=#fefefe
| 89730 ||  || — || December 22, 2001 || Socorro || LINEAR || FLO || align=right | 2.6 km || 
|-id=731 bgcolor=#fefefe
| 89731 ||  || — || December 17, 2001 || Palomar || NEAT || V || align=right | 1.3 km || 
|-id=732 bgcolor=#fefefe
| 89732 ||  || — || December 18, 2001 || Socorro || LINEAR || NYS || align=right | 1.3 km || 
|-id=733 bgcolor=#d6d6d6
| 89733 ||  || — || December 19, 2001 || Palomar || NEAT || ALA || align=right | 5.6 km || 
|-id=734 bgcolor=#E9E9E9
| 89734 || 2002 AH || — || January 4, 2002 || San Marcello || M. Tombelli, A. Boattini || — || align=right | 2.6 km || 
|-id=735 bgcolor=#d6d6d6
| 89735 Tommei || 2002 AM ||  || January 4, 2002 || San Marcello || A. Boattini, L. Tesi || — || align=right | 7.1 km || 
|-id=736 bgcolor=#fefefe
| 89736 ||  || — || January 15, 2002 || Socorro || LINEAR || V || align=right | 1.9 km || 
|-id=737 bgcolor=#d6d6d6
| 89737 ||  || — || January 8, 2002 || Oizumi || T. Kobayashi || — || align=right | 4.3 km || 
|-id=738 bgcolor=#E9E9E9
| 89738 ||  || — || January 9, 2002 || Oizumi || T. Kobayashi || — || align=right | 2.8 km || 
|-id=739 bgcolor=#E9E9E9
| 89739 Rampazzi ||  ||  || January 9, 2002 || Cima Ekar || ADAS || — || align=right | 2.5 km || 
|-id=740 bgcolor=#d6d6d6
| 89740 ||  || — || January 9, 2002 || Nashville || R. Clingan || — || align=right | 5.4 km || 
|-id=741 bgcolor=#d6d6d6
| 89741 ||  || — || January 11, 2002 || Desert Eagle || W. K. Y. Yeung || — || align=right | 4.4 km || 
|-id=742 bgcolor=#d6d6d6
| 89742 ||  || — || January 5, 2002 || Haleakala || NEAT || — || align=right | 7.2 km || 
|-id=743 bgcolor=#d6d6d6
| 89743 ||  || — || January 5, 2002 || Haleakala || NEAT || EOS || align=right | 4.1 km || 
|-id=744 bgcolor=#E9E9E9
| 89744 ||  || — || January 8, 2002 || Cima Ekar || ADAS || — || align=right | 4.6 km || 
|-id=745 bgcolor=#d6d6d6
| 89745 ||  || — || January 8, 2002 || Socorro || LINEAR || HYG || align=right | 8.4 km || 
|-id=746 bgcolor=#fefefe
| 89746 ||  || — || January 5, 2002 || Haleakala || NEAT || — || align=right | 2.8 km || 
|-id=747 bgcolor=#fefefe
| 89747 ||  || — || January 6, 2002 || Haleakala || NEAT || V || align=right | 1.6 km || 
|-id=748 bgcolor=#fefefe
| 89748 ||  || — || January 9, 2002 || Socorro || LINEAR || — || align=right | 5.2 km || 
|-id=749 bgcolor=#E9E9E9
| 89749 ||  || — || January 6, 2002 || Palomar || NEAT || — || align=right | 5.5 km || 
|-id=750 bgcolor=#fefefe
| 89750 ||  || — || January 7, 2002 || Palomar || NEAT || — || align=right | 2.5 km || 
|-id=751 bgcolor=#E9E9E9
| 89751 ||  || — || January 11, 2002 || Kitt Peak || Spacewatch || MAR || align=right | 3.2 km || 
|-id=752 bgcolor=#fefefe
| 89752 ||  || — || January 12, 2002 || Palomar || NEAT || — || align=right | 1.9 km || 
|-id=753 bgcolor=#d6d6d6
| 89753 ||  || — || January 10, 2002 || Palomar || NEAT || — || align=right | 5.9 km || 
|-id=754 bgcolor=#fefefe
| 89754 ||  || — || January 9, 2002 || Socorro || LINEAR || — || align=right | 1.6 km || 
|-id=755 bgcolor=#E9E9E9
| 89755 ||  || — || January 9, 2002 || Socorro || LINEAR || — || align=right | 1.9 km || 
|-id=756 bgcolor=#d6d6d6
| 89756 ||  || — || January 9, 2002 || Socorro || LINEAR || — || align=right | 5.2 km || 
|-id=757 bgcolor=#d6d6d6
| 89757 ||  || — || January 9, 2002 || Socorro || LINEAR || — || align=right | 4.8 km || 
|-id=758 bgcolor=#fefefe
| 89758 ||  || — || January 9, 2002 || Socorro || LINEAR || MAS || align=right | 1.2 km || 
|-id=759 bgcolor=#E9E9E9
| 89759 ||  || — || January 9, 2002 || Socorro || LINEAR || HEN || align=right | 2.1 km || 
|-id=760 bgcolor=#E9E9E9
| 89760 ||  || — || January 9, 2002 || Socorro || LINEAR || WIT || align=right | 1.7 km || 
|-id=761 bgcolor=#fefefe
| 89761 ||  || — || January 9, 2002 || Socorro || LINEAR || NYS || align=right | 2.3 km || 
|-id=762 bgcolor=#fefefe
| 89762 ||  || — || January 9, 2002 || Socorro || LINEAR || MAS || align=right | 1.8 km || 
|-id=763 bgcolor=#fefefe
| 89763 ||  || — || January 11, 2002 || Socorro || LINEAR || FLO || align=right | 1.7 km || 
|-id=764 bgcolor=#E9E9E9
| 89764 ||  || — || January 11, 2002 || Socorro || LINEAR || — || align=right | 3.8 km || 
|-id=765 bgcolor=#d6d6d6
| 89765 ||  || — || January 11, 2002 || Socorro || LINEAR || — || align=right | 4.8 km || 
|-id=766 bgcolor=#FA8072
| 89766 ||  || — || January 11, 2002 || Socorro || LINEAR || — || align=right | 2.0 km || 
|-id=767 bgcolor=#fefefe
| 89767 ||  || — || January 8, 2002 || Socorro || LINEAR || NYS || align=right | 1.5 km || 
|-id=768 bgcolor=#fefefe
| 89768 ||  || — || January 8, 2002 || Socorro || LINEAR || NYS || align=right | 1.3 km || 
|-id=769 bgcolor=#fefefe
| 89769 ||  || — || January 8, 2002 || Socorro || LINEAR || — || align=right | 1.6 km || 
|-id=770 bgcolor=#fefefe
| 89770 ||  || — || January 9, 2002 || Socorro || LINEAR || — || align=right | 3.5 km || 
|-id=771 bgcolor=#E9E9E9
| 89771 ||  || — || January 9, 2002 || Socorro || LINEAR || — || align=right | 3.5 km || 
|-id=772 bgcolor=#E9E9E9
| 89772 ||  || — || January 9, 2002 || Socorro || LINEAR || — || align=right | 2.6 km || 
|-id=773 bgcolor=#d6d6d6
| 89773 ||  || — || January 9, 2002 || Socorro || LINEAR || — || align=right | 9.3 km || 
|-id=774 bgcolor=#d6d6d6
| 89774 ||  || — || January 9, 2002 || Socorro || LINEAR || — || align=right | 4.6 km || 
|-id=775 bgcolor=#E9E9E9
| 89775 ||  || — || January 11, 2002 || Socorro || LINEAR || — || align=right | 2.0 km || 
|-id=776 bgcolor=#FA8072
| 89776 ||  || — || January 11, 2002 || Socorro || LINEAR || — || align=right | 3.4 km || 
|-id=777 bgcolor=#d6d6d6
| 89777 ||  || — || January 12, 2002 || Socorro || LINEAR || ALA || align=right | 7.6 km || 
|-id=778 bgcolor=#E9E9E9
| 89778 ||  || — || January 8, 2002 || Socorro || LINEAR || EUN || align=right | 2.7 km || 
|-id=779 bgcolor=#E9E9E9
| 89779 ||  || — || January 8, 2002 || Socorro || LINEAR || WIT || align=right | 2.0 km || 
|-id=780 bgcolor=#fefefe
| 89780 ||  || — || January 8, 2002 || Socorro || LINEAR || NYS || align=right | 3.2 km || 
|-id=781 bgcolor=#fefefe
| 89781 ||  || — || January 9, 2002 || Socorro || LINEAR || — || align=right | 1.4 km || 
|-id=782 bgcolor=#d6d6d6
| 89782 ||  || — || January 9, 2002 || Socorro || LINEAR || — || align=right | 7.2 km || 
|-id=783 bgcolor=#d6d6d6
| 89783 ||  || — || January 9, 2002 || Socorro || LINEAR || — || align=right | 3.6 km || 
|-id=784 bgcolor=#E9E9E9
| 89784 ||  || — || January 9, 2002 || Socorro || LINEAR || — || align=right | 2.6 km || 
|-id=785 bgcolor=#d6d6d6
| 89785 ||  || — || January 9, 2002 || Socorro || LINEAR || JLI || align=right | 6.5 km || 
|-id=786 bgcolor=#E9E9E9
| 89786 ||  || — || January 9, 2002 || Socorro || LINEAR || — || align=right | 4.8 km || 
|-id=787 bgcolor=#fefefe
| 89787 ||  || — || January 9, 2002 || Socorro || LINEAR || NYS || align=right | 1.7 km || 
|-id=788 bgcolor=#d6d6d6
| 89788 ||  || — || January 9, 2002 || Socorro || LINEAR || — || align=right | 6.7 km || 
|-id=789 bgcolor=#d6d6d6
| 89789 ||  || — || January 9, 2002 || Socorro || LINEAR || — || align=right | 6.1 km || 
|-id=790 bgcolor=#d6d6d6
| 89790 ||  || — || January 9, 2002 || Socorro || LINEAR || — || align=right | 4.1 km || 
|-id=791 bgcolor=#fefefe
| 89791 ||  || — || January 9, 2002 || Socorro || LINEAR || — || align=right | 1.8 km || 
|-id=792 bgcolor=#d6d6d6
| 89792 ||  || — || January 9, 2002 || Socorro || LINEAR || — || align=right | 4.8 km || 
|-id=793 bgcolor=#d6d6d6
| 89793 ||  || — || January 9, 2002 || Socorro || LINEAR || THM || align=right | 7.4 km || 
|-id=794 bgcolor=#d6d6d6
| 89794 ||  || — || January 11, 2002 || Socorro || LINEAR || TIR || align=right | 4.7 km || 
|-id=795 bgcolor=#d6d6d6
| 89795 ||  || — || January 13, 2002 || Socorro || LINEAR || KOR || align=right | 2.5 km || 
|-id=796 bgcolor=#d6d6d6
| 89796 ||  || — || January 12, 2002 || Palomar || NEAT || HYG || align=right | 7.3 km || 
|-id=797 bgcolor=#E9E9E9
| 89797 ||  || — || January 9, 2002 || Socorro || LINEAR || — || align=right | 2.1 km || 
|-id=798 bgcolor=#fefefe
| 89798 ||  || — || January 9, 2002 || Socorro || LINEAR || V || align=right | 1.4 km || 
|-id=799 bgcolor=#E9E9E9
| 89799 ||  || — || January 13, 2002 || Socorro || LINEAR || — || align=right | 4.4 km || 
|-id=800 bgcolor=#d6d6d6
| 89800 ||  || — || January 11, 2002 || Socorro || LINEAR || — || align=right | 7.7 km || 
|}

89801–89900 

|-bgcolor=#E9E9E9
| 89801 ||  || — || January 14, 2002 || Socorro || LINEAR || — || align=right | 3.7 km || 
|-id=802 bgcolor=#fefefe
| 89802 ||  || — || January 14, 2002 || Socorro || LINEAR || — || align=right | 2.1 km || 
|-id=803 bgcolor=#d6d6d6
| 89803 ||  || — || January 14, 2002 || Socorro || LINEAR || HYG || align=right | 6.5 km || 
|-id=804 bgcolor=#d6d6d6
| 89804 ||  || — || January 13, 2002 || Socorro || LINEAR || — || align=right | 7.8 km || 
|-id=805 bgcolor=#d6d6d6
| 89805 ||  || — || January 13, 2002 || Socorro || LINEAR || EUP || align=right | 6.9 km || 
|-id=806 bgcolor=#d6d6d6
| 89806 ||  || — || January 13, 2002 || Socorro || LINEAR || — || align=right | 8.0 km || 
|-id=807 bgcolor=#fefefe
| 89807 ||  || — || January 13, 2002 || Socorro || LINEAR || — || align=right | 4.9 km || 
|-id=808 bgcolor=#d6d6d6
| 89808 ||  || — || January 13, 2002 || Socorro || LINEAR || THM || align=right | 7.0 km || 
|-id=809 bgcolor=#d6d6d6
| 89809 ||  || — || January 13, 2002 || Socorro || LINEAR || KOR || align=right | 3.9 km || 
|-id=810 bgcolor=#fefefe
| 89810 ||  || — || January 14, 2002 || Socorro || LINEAR || NYS || align=right | 1.2 km || 
|-id=811 bgcolor=#d6d6d6
| 89811 ||  || — || January 14, 2002 || Socorro || LINEAR || — || align=right | 6.4 km || 
|-id=812 bgcolor=#d6d6d6
| 89812 ||  || — || January 14, 2002 || Socorro || LINEAR || KOR || align=right | 3.9 km || 
|-id=813 bgcolor=#E9E9E9
| 89813 ||  || — || January 5, 2002 || Palomar || NEAT || — || align=right | 3.0 km || 
|-id=814 bgcolor=#E9E9E9
| 89814 ||  || — || January 5, 2002 || Palomar || NEAT || — || align=right | 3.2 km || 
|-id=815 bgcolor=#d6d6d6
| 89815 ||  || — || January 8, 2002 || Socorro || LINEAR || — || align=right | 5.2 km || 
|-id=816 bgcolor=#fefefe
| 89816 ||  || — || January 8, 2002 || Socorro || LINEAR || — || align=right | 5.2 km || 
|-id=817 bgcolor=#E9E9E9
| 89817 ||  || — || January 10, 2002 || Palomar || NEAT || — || align=right | 2.4 km || 
|-id=818 bgcolor=#E9E9E9
| 89818 Jureskvarč ||  ||  || January 2, 2002 || Cima Ekar || ADAS || — || align=right | 1.9 km || 
|-id=819 bgcolor=#E9E9E9
| 89819 ||  || — || January 19, 2002 || Desert Eagle || W. K. Y. Yeung || — || align=right | 2.7 km || 
|-id=820 bgcolor=#E9E9E9
| 89820 ||  || — || January 18, 2002 || Anderson Mesa || LONEOS || — || align=right | 3.5 km || 
|-id=821 bgcolor=#d6d6d6
| 89821 ||  || — || January 20, 2002 || Anderson Mesa || LONEOS || EMA || align=right | 8.3 km || 
|-id=822 bgcolor=#fefefe
| 89822 ||  || — || January 18, 2002 || Anderson Mesa || LONEOS || — || align=right | 3.2 km || 
|-id=823 bgcolor=#d6d6d6
| 89823 ||  || — || January 18, 2002 || Socorro || LINEAR || — || align=right | 6.0 km || 
|-id=824 bgcolor=#fefefe
| 89824 ||  || — || January 19, 2002 || Socorro || LINEAR || FLO || align=right | 1.8 km || 
|-id=825 bgcolor=#d6d6d6
| 89825 ||  || — || January 19, 2002 || Socorro || LINEAR || — || align=right | 4.4 km || 
|-id=826 bgcolor=#d6d6d6
| 89826 ||  || — || January 19, 2002 || Socorro || LINEAR || KOR || align=right | 3.3 km || 
|-id=827 bgcolor=#fefefe
| 89827 ||  || — || January 21, 2002 || Socorro || LINEAR || — || align=right | 2.2 km || 
|-id=828 bgcolor=#d6d6d6
| 89828 ||  || — || January 19, 2002 || Anderson Mesa || LONEOS || EUP || align=right | 12 km || 
|-id=829 bgcolor=#C2FFFF
| 89829 ||  || — || January 20, 2002 || Anderson Mesa || LONEOS || L4 || align=right | 17 km || 
|-id=830 bgcolor=#FFC2E0
| 89830 || 2002 CE || — || February 1, 2002 || Socorro || LINEAR || AMO +1kmPHA || align=right | 5.1 km || 
|-id=831 bgcolor=#d6d6d6
| 89831 ||  || — || February 5, 2002 || Fountain Hills || C. W. Juels, P. R. Holvorcem || — || align=right | 8.5 km || 
|-id=832 bgcolor=#fefefe
| 89832 ||  || — || February 4, 2002 || Haleakala || NEAT || NYS || align=right | 1.3 km || 
|-id=833 bgcolor=#d6d6d6
| 89833 ||  || — || February 4, 2002 || Palomar || NEAT || — || align=right | 4.3 km || 
|-id=834 bgcolor=#fefefe
| 89834 ||  || — || February 6, 2002 || Socorro || LINEAR || PHO || align=right | 3.0 km || 
|-id=835 bgcolor=#E9E9E9
| 89835 ||  || — || February 7, 2002 || Ametlla de Mar || J. Nomen || — || align=right | 2.9 km || 
|-id=836 bgcolor=#C2FFFF
| 89836 ||  || — || February 7, 2002 || Socorro || LINEAR || L4 || align=right | 13 km || 
|-id=837 bgcolor=#E9E9E9
| 89837 ||  || — || February 6, 2002 || Palomar || NEAT || — || align=right | 2.0 km || 
|-id=838 bgcolor=#d6d6d6
| 89838 ||  || — || February 6, 2002 || Socorro || LINEAR || URS || align=right | 4.3 km || 
|-id=839 bgcolor=#d6d6d6
| 89839 ||  || — || February 6, 2002 || Socorro || LINEAR || — || align=right | 4.1 km || 
|-id=840 bgcolor=#d6d6d6
| 89840 ||  || — || February 7, 2002 || Socorro || LINEAR || KOR || align=right | 3.3 km || 
|-id=841 bgcolor=#C2FFFF
| 89841 ||  || — || February 7, 2002 || Palomar || NEAT || L4 || align=right | 18 km || 
|-id=842 bgcolor=#d6d6d6
| 89842 ||  || — || February 3, 2002 || Haleakala || NEAT || — || align=right | 5.8 km || 
|-id=843 bgcolor=#d6d6d6
| 89843 ||  || — || February 13, 2002 || Farpoint || G. Hug || — || align=right | 5.2 km || 
|-id=844 bgcolor=#C2FFFF
| 89844 ||  || — || February 6, 2002 || Socorro || LINEAR || L4 || align=right | 16 km || 
|-id=845 bgcolor=#d6d6d6
| 89845 ||  || — || February 6, 2002 || Socorro || LINEAR || — || align=right | 6.3 km || 
|-id=846 bgcolor=#fefefe
| 89846 ||  || — || February 7, 2002 || Socorro || LINEAR || MAS || align=right | 1.4 km || 
|-id=847 bgcolor=#d6d6d6
| 89847 ||  || — || February 7, 2002 || Socorro || LINEAR || — || align=right | 4.7 km || 
|-id=848 bgcolor=#d6d6d6
| 89848 ||  || — || February 7, 2002 || Socorro || LINEAR || KOR || align=right | 2.5 km || 
|-id=849 bgcolor=#E9E9E9
| 89849 ||  || — || February 7, 2002 || Socorro || LINEAR || AST || align=right | 3.7 km || 
|-id=850 bgcolor=#d6d6d6
| 89850 ||  || — || February 7, 2002 || Socorro || LINEAR || — || align=right | 5.9 km || 
|-id=851 bgcolor=#E9E9E9
| 89851 ||  || — || February 7, 2002 || Socorro || LINEAR || — || align=right | 4.5 km || 
|-id=852 bgcolor=#C2FFFF
| 89852 ||  || — || February 7, 2002 || Socorro || LINEAR || L4 || align=right | 14 km || 
|-id=853 bgcolor=#E9E9E9
| 89853 ||  || — || February 7, 2002 || Socorro || LINEAR || GEF || align=right | 2.6 km || 
|-id=854 bgcolor=#d6d6d6
| 89854 ||  || — || February 7, 2002 || Socorro || LINEAR || CHA || align=right | 3.9 km || 
|-id=855 bgcolor=#d6d6d6
| 89855 ||  || — || February 7, 2002 || Socorro || LINEAR || EOS || align=right | 4.4 km || 
|-id=856 bgcolor=#d6d6d6
| 89856 ||  || — || February 7, 2002 || Socorro || LINEAR || KOR || align=right | 2.9 km || 
|-id=857 bgcolor=#d6d6d6
| 89857 ||  || — || February 7, 2002 || Socorro || LINEAR || — || align=right | 7.8 km || 
|-id=858 bgcolor=#C2FFFF
| 89858 ||  || — || February 7, 2002 || Socorro || LINEAR || L4 || align=right | 19 km || 
|-id=859 bgcolor=#d6d6d6
| 89859 ||  || — || February 12, 2002 || Desert Eagle || W. K. Y. Yeung || — || align=right | 7.9 km || 
|-id=860 bgcolor=#fefefe
| 89860 ||  || — || February 7, 2002 || Socorro || LINEAR || — || align=right | 2.0 km || 
|-id=861 bgcolor=#E9E9E9
| 89861 ||  || — || February 7, 2002 || Socorro || LINEAR || — || align=right | 2.2 km || 
|-id=862 bgcolor=#d6d6d6
| 89862 ||  || — || February 7, 2002 || Socorro || LINEAR || — || align=right | 6.8 km || 
|-id=863 bgcolor=#d6d6d6
| 89863 ||  || — || February 7, 2002 || Socorro || LINEAR || — || align=right | 5.6 km || 
|-id=864 bgcolor=#d6d6d6
| 89864 ||  || — || February 7, 2002 || Socorro || LINEAR || — || align=right | 6.0 km || 
|-id=865 bgcolor=#d6d6d6
| 89865 ||  || — || February 7, 2002 || Socorro || LINEAR || KOR || align=right | 3.0 km || 
|-id=866 bgcolor=#d6d6d6
| 89866 ||  || — || February 7, 2002 || Socorro || LINEAR || — || align=right | 4.5 km || 
|-id=867 bgcolor=#E9E9E9
| 89867 ||  || — || February 8, 2002 || Socorro || LINEAR || — || align=right | 2.1 km || 
|-id=868 bgcolor=#d6d6d6
| 89868 ||  || — || February 8, 2002 || Socorro || LINEAR || — || align=right | 8.8 km || 
|-id=869 bgcolor=#d6d6d6
| 89869 ||  || — || February 8, 2002 || Socorro || LINEAR || — || align=right | 5.1 km || 
|-id=870 bgcolor=#fefefe
| 89870 ||  || — || February 9, 2002 || Socorro || LINEAR || — || align=right | 1.7 km || 
|-id=871 bgcolor=#C2FFFF
| 89871 ||  || — || February 9, 2002 || Socorro || LINEAR || L4 || align=right | 16 km || 
|-id=872 bgcolor=#C2FFFF
| 89872 ||  || — || February 9, 2002 || Socorro || LINEAR || L4 || align=right | 19 km || 
|-id=873 bgcolor=#E9E9E9
| 89873 ||  || — || February 7, 2002 || Socorro || LINEAR || EUN || align=right | 3.0 km || 
|-id=874 bgcolor=#fefefe
| 89874 ||  || — || February 8, 2002 || Socorro || LINEAR || — || align=right | 2.2 km || 
|-id=875 bgcolor=#d6d6d6
| 89875 ||  || — || February 8, 2002 || Socorro || LINEAR || EMA || align=right | 8.5 km || 
|-id=876 bgcolor=#d6d6d6
| 89876 ||  || — || February 10, 2002 || Socorro || LINEAR || — || align=right | 5.1 km || 
|-id=877 bgcolor=#d6d6d6
| 89877 ||  || — || February 10, 2002 || Socorro || LINEAR || KOR || align=right | 2.7 km || 
|-id=878 bgcolor=#C2FFFF
| 89878 ||  || — || February 10, 2002 || Socorro || LINEAR || L4 || align=right | 13 km || 
|-id=879 bgcolor=#d6d6d6
| 89879 ||  || — || February 10, 2002 || Socorro || LINEAR || KOR || align=right | 2.7 km || 
|-id=880 bgcolor=#d6d6d6
| 89880 ||  || — || February 10, 2002 || Socorro || LINEAR || KOR || align=right | 3.4 km || 
|-id=881 bgcolor=#d6d6d6
| 89881 ||  || — || February 10, 2002 || Socorro || LINEAR || — || align=right | 5.0 km || 
|-id=882 bgcolor=#E9E9E9
| 89882 ||  || — || February 10, 2002 || Socorro || LINEAR || EUN || align=right | 3.5 km || 
|-id=883 bgcolor=#d6d6d6
| 89883 ||  || — || February 11, 2002 || Socorro || LINEAR || KOR || align=right | 2.4 km || 
|-id=884 bgcolor=#d6d6d6
| 89884 ||  || — || February 5, 2002 || Palomar || NEAT || LIX || align=right | 7.7 km || 
|-id=885 bgcolor=#d6d6d6
| 89885 ||  || — || February 6, 2002 || Palomar || NEAT || 7:4 || align=right | 6.6 km || 
|-id=886 bgcolor=#C2FFFF
| 89886 ||  || — || February 14, 2002 || Cerro Tololo || DLS || L4 || align=right | 15 km || 
|-id=887 bgcolor=#E9E9E9
| 89887 ||  || — || February 11, 2002 || Socorro || LINEAR || DOR || align=right | 6.8 km || 
|-id=888 bgcolor=#E9E9E9
| 89888 ||  || — || February 11, 2002 || Socorro || LINEAR || EUN || align=right | 3.5 km || 
|-id=889 bgcolor=#d6d6d6
| 89889 ||  || — || February 13, 2002 || Socorro || LINEAR || — || align=right | 6.0 km || 
|-id=890 bgcolor=#d6d6d6
| 89890 ||  || — || February 15, 2002 || Haleakala || NEAT || — || align=right | 5.2 km || 
|-id=891 bgcolor=#d6d6d6
| 89891 ||  || — || February 4, 2002 || Palomar || NEAT || — || align=right | 3.7 km || 
|-id=892 bgcolor=#d6d6d6
| 89892 ||  || — || February 5, 2002 || Palomar || NEAT || — || align=right | 6.1 km || 
|-id=893 bgcolor=#fefefe
| 89893 ||  || — || February 7, 2002 || Kitt Peak || Spacewatch || MAS || align=right | 1.5 km || 
|-id=894 bgcolor=#E9E9E9
| 89894 ||  || — || February 8, 2002 || Anderson Mesa || LONEOS || — || align=right | 6.0 km || 
|-id=895 bgcolor=#d6d6d6
| 89895 ||  || — || February 8, 2002 || Socorro || LINEAR || — || align=right | 6.4 km || 
|-id=896 bgcolor=#E9E9E9
| 89896 ||  || — || February 9, 2002 || Anderson Mesa || LONEOS || — || align=right | 6.2 km || 
|-id=897 bgcolor=#E9E9E9
| 89897 ||  || — || February 7, 2002 || Socorro || LINEAR || — || align=right | 4.6 km || 
|-id=898 bgcolor=#C2FFFF
| 89898 ||  || — || February 7, 2002 || Kitt Peak || Spacewatch || L4 || align=right | 12 km || 
|-id=899 bgcolor=#d6d6d6
| 89899 ||  || — || February 11, 2002 || Kitt Peak || Spacewatch || — || align=right | 5.9 km || 
|-id=900 bgcolor=#d6d6d6
| 89900 ||  || — || February 11, 2002 || Socorro || LINEAR || — || align=right | 6.7 km || 
|}

89901–90000 

|-bgcolor=#d6d6d6
| 89901 ||  || — || February 12, 2002 || Socorro || LINEAR || — || align=right | 5.3 km || 
|-id=902 bgcolor=#d6d6d6
| 89902 ||  || — || February 4, 2002 || Palomar || NEAT || HYG || align=right | 6.8 km || 
|-id=903 bgcolor=#d6d6d6
| 89903 Post ||  ||  || February 20, 2002 || Desert Moon || B. L. Stevens || 3:2 || align=right | 7.9 km || 
|-id=904 bgcolor=#d6d6d6
| 89904 ||  || — || February 16, 2002 || Haleakala || NEAT || EOS || align=right | 5.0 km || 
|-id=905 bgcolor=#E9E9E9
| 89905 ||  || — || February 19, 2002 || Socorro || LINEAR || EUN || align=right | 3.1 km || 
|-id=906 bgcolor=#d6d6d6
| 89906 ||  || — || February 19, 2002 || Socorro || LINEAR || — || align=right | 8.3 km || 
|-id=907 bgcolor=#E9E9E9
| 89907 ||  || — || February 19, 2002 || Socorro || LINEAR || EUN || align=right | 4.4 km || 
|-id=908 bgcolor=#d6d6d6
| 89908 ||  || — || February 20, 2002 || Kitt Peak || Spacewatch || — || align=right | 7.8 km || 
|-id=909 bgcolor=#d6d6d6
| 89909 Linie ||  ||  || March 8, 2002 || Kleť || KLENOT || THM || align=right | 5.2 km || 
|-id=910 bgcolor=#E9E9E9
| 89910 ||  || — || March 10, 2002 || Cima Ekar || ADAS || — || align=right | 3.9 km || 
|-id=911 bgcolor=#d6d6d6
| 89911 ||  || — || March 9, 2002 || Kvistaberg || UDAS || — || align=right | 4.7 km || 
|-id=912 bgcolor=#d6d6d6
| 89912 ||  || — || March 5, 2002 || Palomar || NEAT || — || align=right | 6.6 km || 
|-id=913 bgcolor=#C2FFFF
| 89913 ||  || — || March 5, 2002 || Kitt Peak || Spacewatch || L4 || align=right | 14 km || 
|-id=914 bgcolor=#d6d6d6
| 89914 ||  || — || March 10, 2002 || Anderson Mesa || LONEOS || — || align=right | 4.6 km || 
|-id=915 bgcolor=#E9E9E9
| 89915 ||  || — || March 9, 2002 || Palomar || NEAT || — || align=right | 4.7 km || 
|-id=916 bgcolor=#fefefe
| 89916 ||  || — || March 10, 2002 || Haleakala || NEAT || V || align=right | 1.4 km || 
|-id=917 bgcolor=#d6d6d6
| 89917 ||  || — || March 11, 2002 || Palomar || NEAT || — || align=right | 6.4 km || 
|-id=918 bgcolor=#C2FFFF
| 89918 ||  || — || March 11, 2002 || Palomar || NEAT || L4 || align=right | 12 km || 
|-id=919 bgcolor=#d6d6d6
| 89919 ||  || — || March 11, 2002 || Palomar || NEAT || EOS || align=right | 3.7 km || 
|-id=920 bgcolor=#E9E9E9
| 89920 ||  || — || March 12, 2002 || Socorro || LINEAR || AGN || align=right | 3.1 km || 
|-id=921 bgcolor=#E9E9E9
| 89921 ||  || — || March 10, 2002 || Haleakala || NEAT || — || align=right | 2.7 km || 
|-id=922 bgcolor=#C2FFFF
| 89922 ||  || — || March 11, 2002 || Palomar || NEAT || L4 || align=right | 12 km || 
|-id=923 bgcolor=#d6d6d6
| 89923 ||  || — || March 12, 2002 || Palomar || NEAT || KOR || align=right | 3.3 km || 
|-id=924 bgcolor=#C2FFFF
| 89924 ||  || — || March 12, 2002 || Kitt Peak || Spacewatch || L4 || align=right | 19 km || 
|-id=925 bgcolor=#d6d6d6
| 89925 ||  || — || March 9, 2002 || Socorro || LINEAR || — || align=right | 9.0 km || 
|-id=926 bgcolor=#E9E9E9
| 89926 ||  || — || March 13, 2002 || Socorro || LINEAR || — || align=right | 8.0 km || 
|-id=927 bgcolor=#C2FFFF
| 89927 ||  || — || March 13, 2002 || Socorro || LINEAR || L4 || align=right | 15 km || 
|-id=928 bgcolor=#d6d6d6
| 89928 ||  || — || March 13, 2002 || Socorro || LINEAR || 3:2 || align=right | 5.8 km || 
|-id=929 bgcolor=#d6d6d6
| 89929 ||  || — || March 14, 2002 || Palomar || NEAT || EOS || align=right | 4.8 km || 
|-id=930 bgcolor=#d6d6d6
| 89930 ||  || — || March 12, 2002 || Palomar || NEAT || EOS || align=right | 3.4 km || 
|-id=931 bgcolor=#d6d6d6
| 89931 ||  || — || March 9, 2002 || Socorro || LINEAR || — || align=right | 7.3 km || 
|-id=932 bgcolor=#E9E9E9
| 89932 ||  || — || March 9, 2002 || Socorro || LINEAR || ADE || align=right | 7.2 km || 
|-id=933 bgcolor=#d6d6d6
| 89933 ||  || — || March 9, 2002 || Socorro || LINEAR || — || align=right | 4.0 km || 
|-id=934 bgcolor=#C2FFFF
| 89934 ||  || — || March 14, 2002 || Socorro || LINEAR || L4 || align=right | 18 km || 
|-id=935 bgcolor=#C2FFFF
| 89935 ||  || — || March 12, 2002 || Palomar || NEAT || L4 || align=right | 17 km || 
|-id=936 bgcolor=#d6d6d6
| 89936 ||  || — || March 15, 2002 || Palomar || NEAT || EOS || align=right | 4.7 km || 
|-id=937 bgcolor=#d6d6d6
| 89937 ||  || — || March 19, 2002 || Fountain Hills || Fountain Hills Obs. || ALA || align=right | 11 km || 
|-id=938 bgcolor=#C2FFFF
| 89938 ||  || — || March 19, 2002 || Palomar || NEAT || L4006 || align=right | 17 km || 
|-id=939 bgcolor=#d6d6d6
| 89939 ||  || — || March 16, 2002 || Socorro || LINEAR || — || align=right | 8.4 km || 
|-id=940 bgcolor=#C2FFFF
| 89940 ||  || — || March 16, 2002 || Socorro || LINEAR || L4 || align=right | 20 km || 
|-id=941 bgcolor=#d6d6d6
| 89941 ||  || — || March 19, 2002 || Palomar || NEAT || ALA || align=right | 8.4 km || 
|-id=942 bgcolor=#d6d6d6
| 89942 ||  || — || March 17, 2002 || Kitt Peak || Spacewatch || — || align=right | 11 km || 
|-id=943 bgcolor=#fefefe
| 89943 ||  || — || March 20, 2002 || Socorro || LINEAR || — || align=right | 1.3 km || 
|-id=944 bgcolor=#E9E9E9
| 89944 ||  || — || March 20, 2002 || Anderson Mesa || LONEOS || — || align=right | 5.2 km || 
|-id=945 bgcolor=#d6d6d6
| 89945 ||  || — || April 1, 2002 || Palomar || NEAT || — || align=right | 5.1 km || 
|-id=946 bgcolor=#E9E9E9
| 89946 ||  || — || April 4, 2002 || Kitt Peak || Spacewatch || — || align=right | 5.5 km || 
|-id=947 bgcolor=#d6d6d6
| 89947 ||  || — || April 4, 2002 || Haleakala || NEAT || 7:4 || align=right | 6.3 km || 
|-id=948 bgcolor=#d6d6d6
| 89948 ||  || — || April 8, 2002 || Palomar || NEAT || EOS || align=right | 4.3 km || 
|-id=949 bgcolor=#E9E9E9
| 89949 ||  || — || April 12, 2002 || Palomar || NEAT || NEM || align=right | 5.2 km || 
|-id=950 bgcolor=#d6d6d6
| 89950 ||  || — || April 12, 2002 || Socorro || LINEAR || EOS || align=right | 4.6 km || 
|-id=951 bgcolor=#d6d6d6
| 89951 ||  || — || April 13, 2002 || Palomar || NEAT || EOS || align=right | 4.9 km || 
|-id=952 bgcolor=#d6d6d6
| 89952 ||  || — || May 6, 2002 || Palomar || NEAT || ALA || align=right | 6.9 km || 
|-id=953 bgcolor=#E9E9E9
| 89953 ||  || — || May 11, 2002 || Socorro || LINEAR || — || align=right | 1.8 km || 
|-id=954 bgcolor=#E9E9E9
| 89954 ||  || — || May 13, 2002 || Palomar || NEAT || — || align=right | 2.6 km || 
|-id=955 bgcolor=#E9E9E9
| 89955 ||  || — || May 5, 2002 || Palomar || NEAT || — || align=right | 4.0 km || 
|-id=956 bgcolor=#d6d6d6
| 89956 Leibacher ||  ||  || June 6, 2002 || Fountain Hills || C. W. Juels, P. R. Holvorcem || — || align=right | 7.6 km || 
|-id=957 bgcolor=#E9E9E9
| 89957 ||  || — || June 10, 2002 || Socorro || LINEAR || — || align=right | 4.0 km || 
|-id=958 bgcolor=#FFC2E0
| 89958 ||  || — || June 14, 2002 || Socorro || LINEAR || APO +1kmPHA || align=right | 1.3 km || 
|-id=959 bgcolor=#FFC2E0
| 89959 ||  || — || July 9, 2002 || Socorro || LINEAR || APO +1kmPHA || align=right | 1.4 km || 
|-id=960 bgcolor=#d6d6d6
| 89960 ||  || — || July 9, 2002 || Socorro || LINEAR || — || align=right | 5.3 km || 
|-id=961 bgcolor=#d6d6d6
| 89961 ||  || — || August 12, 2002 || Socorro || LINEAR || — || align=right | 6.5 km || 
|-id=962 bgcolor=#E9E9E9
| 89962 ||  || — || August 14, 2002 || Socorro || LINEAR || — || align=right | 3.5 km || 
|-id=963 bgcolor=#fefefe
| 89963 ||  || — || August 18, 2002 || Socorro || LINEAR || H || align=right | 1.6 km || 
|-id=964 bgcolor=#fefefe
| 89964 ||  || — || August 28, 2002 || Socorro || LINEAR || H || align=right | 1.4 km || 
|-id=965 bgcolor=#d6d6d6
| 89965 ||  || — || September 3, 2002 || Haleakala || NEAT || KOR || align=right | 3.4 km || 
|-id=966 bgcolor=#E9E9E9
| 89966 ||  || — || September 4, 2002 || Anderson Mesa || LONEOS || — || align=right | 2.2 km || 
|-id=967 bgcolor=#d6d6d6
| 89967 ||  || — || September 5, 2002 || Socorro || LINEAR || — || align=right | 4.2 km || 
|-id=968 bgcolor=#fefefe
| 89968 ||  || — || September 5, 2002 || Socorro || LINEAR || — || align=right | 1.4 km || 
|-id=969 bgcolor=#fefefe
| 89969 ||  || — || September 5, 2002 || Socorro || LINEAR || NYS || align=right | 1.1 km || 
|-id=970 bgcolor=#E9E9E9
| 89970 ||  || — || September 5, 2002 || Socorro || LINEAR || — || align=right | 1.6 km || 
|-id=971 bgcolor=#E9E9E9
| 89971 ||  || — || September 5, 2002 || Socorro || LINEAR || — || align=right | 3.6 km || 
|-id=972 bgcolor=#E9E9E9
| 89972 ||  || — || September 5, 2002 || Socorro || LINEAR || — || align=right | 2.0 km || 
|-id=973 bgcolor=#fefefe
| 89973 Aranyjános ||  ||  || September 8, 2002 || Piszkéstető || K. Sárneczky || — || align=right | 1.4 km || 
|-id=974 bgcolor=#E9E9E9
| 89974 ||  || — || September 11, 2002 || Haleakala || NEAT || — || align=right | 2.0 km || 
|-id=975 bgcolor=#fefefe
| 89975 ||  || — || September 12, 2002 || Haleakala || NEAT || PHO || align=right | 4.8 km || 
|-id=976 bgcolor=#d6d6d6
| 89976 ||  || — || September 26, 2002 || Palomar || NEAT || — || align=right | 5.4 km || 
|-id=977 bgcolor=#fefefe
| 89977 ||  || — || October 1, 2002 || Anderson Mesa || LONEOS || EUT || align=right | 1.3 km || 
|-id=978 bgcolor=#d6d6d6
| 89978 ||  || — || October 2, 2002 || Socorro || LINEAR || KOR || align=right | 3.1 km || 
|-id=979 bgcolor=#fefefe
| 89979 ||  || — || October 2, 2002 || Socorro || LINEAR || PHO || align=right | 2.4 km || 
|-id=980 bgcolor=#d6d6d6
| 89980 ||  || — || October 2, 2002 || Socorro || LINEAR || THM || align=right | 6.7 km || 
|-id=981 bgcolor=#E9E9E9
| 89981 ||  || — || October 2, 2002 || Socorro || LINEAR || ADE || align=right | 4.8 km || 
|-id=982 bgcolor=#fefefe
| 89982 ||  || — || October 2, 2002 || Socorro || LINEAR || MAS || align=right | 1.5 km || 
|-id=983 bgcolor=#d6d6d6
| 89983 ||  || — || October 2, 2002 || Socorro || LINEAR || — || align=right | 6.4 km || 
|-id=984 bgcolor=#fefefe
| 89984 ||  || — || October 2, 2002 || Socorro || LINEAR || V || align=right | 1.4 km || 
|-id=985 bgcolor=#d6d6d6
| 89985 ||  || — || October 2, 2002 || Socorro || LINEAR || — || align=right | 4.9 km || 
|-id=986 bgcolor=#fefefe
| 89986 ||  || — || October 2, 2002 || Socorro || LINEAR || — || align=right | 2.0 km || 
|-id=987 bgcolor=#E9E9E9
| 89987 ||  || — || October 2, 2002 || Socorro || LINEAR || — || align=right | 2.9 km || 
|-id=988 bgcolor=#d6d6d6
| 89988 ||  || — || October 2, 2002 || Socorro || LINEAR || KOR || align=right | 2.9 km || 
|-id=989 bgcolor=#E9E9E9
| 89989 ||  || — || October 2, 2002 || Socorro || LINEAR || — || align=right | 1.9 km || 
|-id=990 bgcolor=#E9E9E9
| 89990 ||  || — || October 2, 2002 || Socorro || LINEAR || — || align=right | 1.6 km || 
|-id=991 bgcolor=#fefefe
| 89991 ||  || — || October 1, 2002 || Anderson Mesa || LONEOS || V || align=right | 1.3 km || 
|-id=992 bgcolor=#fefefe
| 89992 ||  || — || October 5, 2002 || Socorro || LINEAR || H || align=right | 1.9 km || 
|-id=993 bgcolor=#fefefe
| 89993 ||  || — || October 6, 2002 || Socorro || LINEAR || H || align=right | 1.3 km || 
|-id=994 bgcolor=#fefefe
| 89994 ||  || — || October 8, 2002 || Palomar || NEAT || PHO || align=right | 2.2 km || 
|-id=995 bgcolor=#d6d6d6
| 89995 ||  || — || October 3, 2002 || Palomar || NEAT || — || align=right | 5.1 km || 
|-id=996 bgcolor=#fefefe
| 89996 ||  || — || October 1, 2002 || Socorro || LINEAR || V || align=right | 1.4 km || 
|-id=997 bgcolor=#fefefe
| 89997 ||  || — || October 1, 2002 || Socorro || LINEAR || — || align=right | 1.9 km || 
|-id=998 bgcolor=#E9E9E9
| 89998 ||  || — || October 2, 2002 || Socorro || LINEAR || — || align=right | 4.2 km || 
|-id=999 bgcolor=#d6d6d6
| 89999 ||  || — || October 3, 2002 || Palomar || NEAT || HYG || align=right | 6.3 km || 
|-id=000 bgcolor=#E9E9E9
| 90000 ||  || — || October 4, 2002 || Socorro || LINEAR || — || align=right | 2.9 km || 
|}

References

External links 
 Discovery Circumstances: Numbered Minor Planets (85001)–(90000) (IAU Minor Planet Center)

0089